

175001–175100 

|-bgcolor=#E9E9E9
| 175001 ||  || — || March 14, 2004 || Socorro || LINEAR || — || align=right | 3.0 km || 
|-id=002 bgcolor=#E9E9E9
| 175002 ||  || — || March 15, 2004 || Socorro || LINEAR || EUN || align=right | 1.9 km || 
|-id=003 bgcolor=#E9E9E9
| 175003 ||  || — || March 15, 2004 || Kitt Peak || Spacewatch || AGN || align=right | 1.6 km || 
|-id=004 bgcolor=#E9E9E9
| 175004 ||  || — || March 15, 2004 || Catalina || CSS || — || align=right | 3.6 km || 
|-id=005 bgcolor=#E9E9E9
| 175005 ||  || — || March 15, 2004 || Socorro || LINEAR || — || align=right | 3.5 km || 
|-id=006 bgcolor=#E9E9E9
| 175006 ||  || — || March 15, 2004 || Catalina || CSS || — || align=right | 2.0 km || 
|-id=007 bgcolor=#E9E9E9
| 175007 ||  || — || March 12, 2004 || Palomar || NEAT || — || align=right | 4.6 km || 
|-id=008 bgcolor=#E9E9E9
| 175008 ||  || — || March 15, 2004 || Socorro || LINEAR || — || align=right | 3.7 km || 
|-id=009 bgcolor=#E9E9E9
| 175009 ||  || — || March 15, 2004 || Socorro || LINEAR || — || align=right | 4.8 km || 
|-id=010 bgcolor=#E9E9E9
| 175010 ||  || — || March 15, 2004 || Socorro || LINEAR || NEM || align=right | 3.4 km || 
|-id=011 bgcolor=#E9E9E9
| 175011 ||  || — || March 15, 2004 || Socorro || LINEAR || — || align=right | 2.5 km || 
|-id=012 bgcolor=#E9E9E9
| 175012 ||  || — || March 11, 2004 || Palomar || NEAT || — || align=right | 2.3 km || 
|-id=013 bgcolor=#d6d6d6
| 175013 ||  || — || March 14, 2004 || Palomar || NEAT || EOS || align=right | 4.3 km || 
|-id=014 bgcolor=#E9E9E9
| 175014 ||  || — || March 16, 2004 || Socorro || LINEAR || NEM || align=right | 4.2 km || 
|-id=015 bgcolor=#E9E9E9
| 175015 ||  || — || March 16, 2004 || Catalina || CSS || — || align=right | 4.0 km || 
|-id=016 bgcolor=#E9E9E9
| 175016 ||  || — || March 16, 2004 || Catalina || CSS || DOR || align=right | 4.6 km || 
|-id=017 bgcolor=#E9E9E9
| 175017 Záboří ||  ||  || March 28, 2004 || Kleť || KLENOT || GEF || align=right | 2.2 km || 
|-id=018 bgcolor=#d6d6d6
| 175018 ||  || — || March 16, 2004 || Socorro || LINEAR || — || align=right | 5.2 km || 
|-id=019 bgcolor=#d6d6d6
| 175019 ||  || — || March 17, 2004 || Catalina || CSS || BRA || align=right | 2.4 km || 
|-id=020 bgcolor=#E9E9E9
| 175020 ||  || — || March 17, 2004 || Kitt Peak || Spacewatch || AGN || align=right | 1.7 km || 
|-id=021 bgcolor=#E9E9E9
| 175021 ||  || — || March 17, 2004 || Kitt Peak || Spacewatch || HEN || align=right | 2.1 km || 
|-id=022 bgcolor=#d6d6d6
| 175022 ||  || — || March 17, 2004 || Kitt Peak || Spacewatch || URS || align=right | 3.9 km || 
|-id=023 bgcolor=#d6d6d6
| 175023 ||  || — || March 17, 2004 || Kitt Peak || Spacewatch || — || align=right | 4.9 km || 
|-id=024 bgcolor=#d6d6d6
| 175024 ||  || — || March 27, 2004 || Bergisch Gladbach || W. Bickel || — || align=right | 5.5 km || 
|-id=025 bgcolor=#E9E9E9
| 175025 ||  || — || March 16, 2004 || Catalina || CSS || — || align=right | 3.8 km || 
|-id=026 bgcolor=#E9E9E9
| 175026 ||  || — || March 16, 2004 || Socorro || LINEAR || — || align=right | 4.2 km || 
|-id=027 bgcolor=#d6d6d6
| 175027 ||  || — || March 16, 2004 || Socorro || LINEAR || — || align=right | 3.8 km || 
|-id=028 bgcolor=#E9E9E9
| 175028 ||  || — || March 17, 2004 || Kitt Peak || Spacewatch || — || align=right | 3.3 km || 
|-id=029 bgcolor=#E9E9E9
| 175029 ||  || — || March 17, 2004 || Kitt Peak || Spacewatch || — || align=right | 1.5 km || 
|-id=030 bgcolor=#E9E9E9
| 175030 ||  || — || March 18, 2004 || Socorro || LINEAR || — || align=right | 3.3 km || 
|-id=031 bgcolor=#d6d6d6
| 175031 ||  || — || March 16, 2004 || Catalina || CSS || — || align=right | 3.1 km || 
|-id=032 bgcolor=#E9E9E9
| 175032 ||  || — || March 16, 2004 || Socorro || LINEAR || — || align=right | 2.4 km || 
|-id=033 bgcolor=#E9E9E9
| 175033 ||  || — || March 18, 2004 || Socorro || LINEAR || INO || align=right | 2.6 km || 
|-id=034 bgcolor=#E9E9E9
| 175034 ||  || — || March 18, 2004 || Socorro || LINEAR || — || align=right | 3.5 km || 
|-id=035 bgcolor=#E9E9E9
| 175035 ||  || — || March 19, 2004 || Socorro || LINEAR || — || align=right | 3.5 km || 
|-id=036 bgcolor=#d6d6d6
| 175036 ||  || — || March 16, 2004 || Kitt Peak || Spacewatch || — || align=right | 3.5 km || 
|-id=037 bgcolor=#d6d6d6
| 175037 ||  || — || March 17, 2004 || Kitt Peak || Spacewatch || — || align=right | 3.8 km || 
|-id=038 bgcolor=#E9E9E9
| 175038 ||  || — || March 19, 2004 || Socorro || LINEAR || AGN || align=right | 2.2 km || 
|-id=039 bgcolor=#E9E9E9
| 175039 ||  || — || March 20, 2004 || Socorro || LINEAR || — || align=right | 1.9 km || 
|-id=040 bgcolor=#E9E9E9
| 175040 ||  || — || March 20, 2004 || Socorro || LINEAR || — || align=right | 1.8 km || 
|-id=041 bgcolor=#E9E9E9
| 175041 ||  || — || March 16, 2004 || Kitt Peak || Spacewatch || XIZ || align=right | 2.1 km || 
|-id=042 bgcolor=#E9E9E9
| 175042 ||  || — || March 17, 2004 || Kitt Peak || Spacewatch || — || align=right | 2.1 km || 
|-id=043 bgcolor=#d6d6d6
| 175043 ||  || — || March 16, 2004 || Socorro || LINEAR || HYG || align=right | 5.6 km || 
|-id=044 bgcolor=#E9E9E9
| 175044 ||  || — || March 16, 2004 || Socorro || LINEAR || MRX || align=right | 1.5 km || 
|-id=045 bgcolor=#E9E9E9
| 175045 ||  || — || March 17, 2004 || Kitt Peak || Spacewatch || — || align=right | 3.3 km || 
|-id=046 bgcolor=#E9E9E9
| 175046 Corporon ||  ||  || March 27, 2004 || Saint-Sulpice || B. Christophe || — || align=right | 2.3 km || 
|-id=047 bgcolor=#E9E9E9
| 175047 ||  || — || March 20, 2004 || Socorro || LINEAR || — || align=right | 4.0 km || 
|-id=048 bgcolor=#d6d6d6
| 175048 ||  || — || March 19, 2004 || Palomar || NEAT || EOS || align=right | 3.8 km || 
|-id=049 bgcolor=#d6d6d6
| 175049 ||  || — || March 23, 2004 || Kitt Peak || Spacewatch || — || align=right | 3.4 km || 
|-id=050 bgcolor=#E9E9E9
| 175050 ||  || — || March 19, 2004 || Socorro || LINEAR || — || align=right | 4.2 km || 
|-id=051 bgcolor=#E9E9E9
| 175051 ||  || — || March 23, 2004 || Kitt Peak || Spacewatch || — || align=right | 3.0 km || 
|-id=052 bgcolor=#d6d6d6
| 175052 ||  || — || March 24, 2004 || Anderson Mesa || LONEOS || KOR || align=right | 2.3 km || 
|-id=053 bgcolor=#E9E9E9
| 175053 ||  || — || March 23, 2004 || Socorro || LINEAR || GEF || align=right | 2.0 km || 
|-id=054 bgcolor=#E9E9E9
| 175054 ||  || — || March 22, 2004 || Socorro || LINEAR || — || align=right | 3.2 km || 
|-id=055 bgcolor=#E9E9E9
| 175055 ||  || — || March 26, 2004 || Socorro || LINEAR || — || align=right | 2.8 km || 
|-id=056 bgcolor=#E9E9E9
| 175056 ||  || — || March 22, 2004 || Anderson Mesa || LONEOS || — || align=right | 3.9 km || 
|-id=057 bgcolor=#E9E9E9
| 175057 ||  || — || March 26, 2004 || Socorro || LINEAR || — || align=right | 2.6 km || 
|-id=058 bgcolor=#E9E9E9
| 175058 ||  || — || March 27, 2004 || Anderson Mesa || LONEOS || — || align=right | 4.3 km || 
|-id=059 bgcolor=#E9E9E9
| 175059 ||  || — || March 16, 2004 || Socorro || LINEAR || — || align=right | 2.8 km || 
|-id=060 bgcolor=#d6d6d6
| 175060 ||  || — || March 17, 2004 || Kitt Peak || Spacewatch || — || align=right | 3.1 km || 
|-id=061 bgcolor=#E9E9E9
| 175061 ||  || — || March 18, 2004 || Catalina || CSS || — || align=right | 1.7 km || 
|-id=062 bgcolor=#E9E9E9
| 175062 || 2004 GJ || — || April 9, 2004 || Palomar || NEAT || — || align=right | 6.5 km || 
|-id=063 bgcolor=#d6d6d6
| 175063 ||  || — || April 9, 2004 || Siding Spring || SSS || THM || align=right | 3.1 km || 
|-id=064 bgcolor=#d6d6d6
| 175064 ||  || — || April 13, 2004 || Palomar || NEAT || — || align=right | 5.5 km || 
|-id=065 bgcolor=#d6d6d6
| 175065 ||  || — || April 12, 2004 || Reedy Creek || J. Broughton || — || align=right | 7.0 km || 
|-id=066 bgcolor=#d6d6d6
| 175066 ||  || — || April 12, 2004 || Kitt Peak || Spacewatch || KOR || align=right | 1.9 km || 
|-id=067 bgcolor=#d6d6d6
| 175067 ||  || — || April 13, 2004 || Kitt Peak || Spacewatch || — || align=right | 3.8 km || 
|-id=068 bgcolor=#d6d6d6
| 175068 ||  || — || April 15, 2004 || Socorro || LINEAR || BRA || align=right | 2.7 km || 
|-id=069 bgcolor=#d6d6d6
| 175069 ||  || — || April 15, 2004 || Uccle || Uccle Obs. || — || align=right | 3.9 km || 
|-id=070 bgcolor=#d6d6d6
| 175070 ||  || — || April 12, 2004 || Palomar || NEAT || — || align=right | 3.8 km || 
|-id=071 bgcolor=#E9E9E9
| 175071 ||  || — || April 13, 2004 || Palomar || NEAT || DOR || align=right | 4.4 km || 
|-id=072 bgcolor=#E9E9E9
| 175072 ||  || — || April 13, 2004 || Palomar || NEAT || CLO || align=right | 3.4 km || 
|-id=073 bgcolor=#E9E9E9
| 175073 ||  || — || April 14, 2004 || Anderson Mesa || LONEOS || — || align=right | 4.1 km || 
|-id=074 bgcolor=#E9E9E9
| 175074 ||  || — || April 11, 2004 || Palomar || NEAT || — || align=right | 3.2 km || 
|-id=075 bgcolor=#d6d6d6
| 175075 ||  || — || April 12, 2004 || Kitt Peak || Spacewatch || THM || align=right | 2.9 km || 
|-id=076 bgcolor=#E9E9E9
| 175076 ||  || — || April 12, 2004 || Siding Spring || SSS || — || align=right | 3.4 km || 
|-id=077 bgcolor=#E9E9E9
| 175077 ||  || — || April 12, 2004 || Palomar || NEAT || — || align=right | 2.2 km || 
|-id=078 bgcolor=#E9E9E9
| 175078 ||  || — || April 13, 2004 || Kitt Peak || Spacewatch || AGN || align=right | 1.7 km || 
|-id=079 bgcolor=#E9E9E9
| 175079 ||  || — || April 12, 2004 || Kitt Peak || Spacewatch || — || align=right | 3.2 km || 
|-id=080 bgcolor=#E9E9E9
| 175080 ||  || — || April 13, 2004 || Kitt Peak || Spacewatch || AGN || align=right | 1.4 km || 
|-id=081 bgcolor=#E9E9E9
| 175081 ||  || — || April 13, 2004 || Kitt Peak || Spacewatch || HOF || align=right | 4.2 km || 
|-id=082 bgcolor=#E9E9E9
| 175082 ||  || — || April 15, 2004 || Socorro || LINEAR || — || align=right | 2.6 km || 
|-id=083 bgcolor=#E9E9E9
| 175083 ||  || — || April 13, 2004 || Kitt Peak || Spacewatch || — || align=right | 1.8 km || 
|-id=084 bgcolor=#d6d6d6
| 175084 ||  || — || April 14, 2004 || Kitt Peak || Spacewatch || — || align=right | 2.5 km || 
|-id=085 bgcolor=#d6d6d6
| 175085 ||  || — || April 16, 2004 || Socorro || LINEAR || — || align=right | 6.6 km || 
|-id=086 bgcolor=#d6d6d6
| 175086 ||  || — || April 16, 2004 || Kitt Peak || Spacewatch || — || align=right | 3.4 km || 
|-id=087 bgcolor=#E9E9E9
| 175087 ||  || — || April 20, 2004 || Socorro || LINEAR || HOF || align=right | 5.1 km || 
|-id=088 bgcolor=#d6d6d6
| 175088 ||  || — || April 21, 2004 || Catalina || CSS || — || align=right | 5.2 km || 
|-id=089 bgcolor=#E9E9E9
| 175089 ||  || — || April 22, 2004 || Siding Spring || SSS || RAF || align=right | 1.5 km || 
|-id=090 bgcolor=#d6d6d6
| 175090 ||  || — || April 24, 2004 || Socorro || LINEAR || — || align=right | 4.4 km || 
|-id=091 bgcolor=#d6d6d6
| 175091 ||  || — || April 25, 2004 || Catalina || CSS || — || align=right | 7.8 km || 
|-id=092 bgcolor=#E9E9E9
| 175092 ||  || — || April 24, 2004 || Catalina || CSS || — || align=right | 3.8 km || 
|-id=093 bgcolor=#E9E9E9
| 175093 ||  || — || April 24, 2004 || Socorro || LINEAR || — || align=right | 5.0 km || 
|-id=094 bgcolor=#d6d6d6
| 175094 ||  || — || April 20, 2004 || Kitt Peak || Spacewatch || — || align=right | 4.7 km || 
|-id=095 bgcolor=#d6d6d6
| 175095 ||  || — || May 9, 2004 || Haleakala || NEAT || — || align=right | 4.2 km || 
|-id=096 bgcolor=#d6d6d6
| 175096 ||  || — || May 9, 2004 || Kitt Peak || Spacewatch || — || align=right | 3.2 km || 
|-id=097 bgcolor=#d6d6d6
| 175097 ||  || — || May 12, 2004 || Siding Spring || SSS || — || align=right | 3.7 km || 
|-id=098 bgcolor=#E9E9E9
| 175098 ||  || — || May 13, 2004 || Anderson Mesa || LONEOS || — || align=right | 2.4 km || 
|-id=099 bgcolor=#d6d6d6
| 175099 ||  || — || May 9, 2004 || Kitt Peak || Spacewatch || — || align=right | 3.1 km || 
|-id=100 bgcolor=#d6d6d6
| 175100 ||  || — || May 13, 2004 || Anderson Mesa || LONEOS || HYG || align=right | 4.7 km || 
|}

175101–175200 

|-bgcolor=#d6d6d6
| 175101 ||  || — || May 14, 2004 || Kitt Peak || Spacewatch || SYL7:4 || align=right | 7.5 km || 
|-id=102 bgcolor=#d6d6d6
| 175102 ||  || — || May 15, 2004 || Socorro || LINEAR || — || align=right | 3.9 km || 
|-id=103 bgcolor=#d6d6d6
| 175103 ||  || — || May 12, 2004 || Catalina || CSS || — || align=right | 5.0 km || 
|-id=104 bgcolor=#d6d6d6
| 175104 ||  || — || May 17, 2004 || Socorro || LINEAR || — || align=right | 3.7 km || 
|-id=105 bgcolor=#d6d6d6
| 175105 ||  || — || May 18, 2004 || Socorro || LINEAR || HYG || align=right | 5.4 km || 
|-id=106 bgcolor=#d6d6d6
| 175106 ||  || — || May 19, 2004 || Campo Imperatore || CINEOS || — || align=right | 3.8 km || 
|-id=107 bgcolor=#E9E9E9
| 175107 ||  || — || May 24, 2004 || Socorro || LINEAR || — || align=right | 4.3 km || 
|-id=108 bgcolor=#d6d6d6
| 175108 ||  || — || June 9, 2004 || Siding Spring || SSS || — || align=right | 3.5 km || 
|-id=109 bgcolor=#d6d6d6
| 175109 Sharickaer ||  ||  || June 25, 2004 || Wrightwood || M. Vale || — || align=right | 5.2 km || 
|-id=110 bgcolor=#d6d6d6
| 175110 ||  || — || July 9, 2004 || Socorro || LINEAR || — || align=right | 4.1 km || 
|-id=111 bgcolor=#d6d6d6
| 175111 ||  || — || July 14, 2004 || Socorro || LINEAR || — || align=right | 3.3 km || 
|-id=112 bgcolor=#d6d6d6
| 175112 ||  || — || August 8, 2004 || Socorro || LINEAR || — || align=right | 3.7 km || 
|-id=113 bgcolor=#C2E0FF
| 175113 ||  || — || August 7, 2004 || Palomar || M. E. Brown, C. Trujillo, D. L. Rabinowitz || cubewano (hot) || align=right | 538 km || 
|-id=114 bgcolor=#FFC2E0
| 175114 || 2004 QQ || — || August 17, 2004 || Socorro || LINEAR || APO +1km || align=right | 1.7 km || 
|-id=115 bgcolor=#d6d6d6
| 175115 ||  || — || September 10, 2004 || Socorro || LINEAR || HIL3:2 || align=right | 10 km || 
|-id=116 bgcolor=#fefefe
| 175116 ||  || — || September 15, 2004 || Socorro || LINEAR || H || align=right data-sort-value="0.99" | 990 m || 
|-id=117 bgcolor=#d6d6d6
| 175117 ||  || — || September 16, 2004 || Kitt Peak || Spacewatch || 3:2 || align=right | 8.3 km || 
|-id=118 bgcolor=#fefefe
| 175118 ||  || — || October 9, 2004 || Kitt Peak || Spacewatch || FLO || align=right | 2.0 km || 
|-id=119 bgcolor=#fefefe
| 175119 ||  || — || October 23, 2004 || Socorro || LINEAR || H || align=right | 1.0 km || 
|-id=120 bgcolor=#fefefe
| 175120 ||  || — || December 1, 2004 || Palomar || NEAT || — || align=right | 1.3 km || 
|-id=121 bgcolor=#fefefe
| 175121 ||  || — || December 11, 2004 || Socorro || LINEAR || H || align=right | 1.4 km || 
|-id=122 bgcolor=#fefefe
| 175122 ||  || — || December 7, 2004 || Socorro || LINEAR || H || align=right data-sort-value="0.92" | 920 m || 
|-id=123 bgcolor=#fefefe
| 175123 ||  || — || December 18, 2004 || Mount Lemmon || Mount Lemmon Survey || FLO || align=right data-sort-value="0.96" | 960 m || 
|-id=124 bgcolor=#fefefe
| 175124 ||  || — || January 7, 2005 || Socorro || LINEAR || PHO || align=right | 2.3 km || 
|-id=125 bgcolor=#fefefe
| 175125 ||  || — || January 13, 2005 || Socorro || LINEAR || — || align=right | 1.2 km || 
|-id=126 bgcolor=#fefefe
| 175126 ||  || — || January 15, 2005 || Kitt Peak || Spacewatch || — || align=right | 1.5 km || 
|-id=127 bgcolor=#fefefe
| 175127 ||  || — || January 15, 2005 || Socorro || LINEAR || — || align=right data-sort-value="0.97" | 970 m || 
|-id=128 bgcolor=#fefefe
| 175128 ||  || — || January 15, 2005 || Kitt Peak || Spacewatch || — || align=right | 1.2 km || 
|-id=129 bgcolor=#C2FFFF
| 175129 ||  || — || January 16, 2005 || Socorro || LINEAR || L5 || align=right | 17 km || 
|-id=130 bgcolor=#fefefe
| 175130 ||  || — || February 1, 2005 || Kitt Peak || Spacewatch || FLO || align=right data-sort-value="0.87" | 870 m || 
|-id=131 bgcolor=#fefefe
| 175131 ||  || — || February 1, 2005 || Kitt Peak || Spacewatch || — || align=right | 1.3 km || 
|-id=132 bgcolor=#E9E9E9
| 175132 ||  || — || February 2, 2005 || Socorro || LINEAR || — || align=right | 6.1 km || 
|-id=133 bgcolor=#fefefe
| 175133 ||  || — || February 2, 2005 || Catalina || CSS || FLO || align=right | 1.1 km || 
|-id=134 bgcolor=#fefefe
| 175134 ||  || — || February 7, 2005 || Bergisch Gladbach || W. Bickel || — || align=right data-sort-value="0.94" | 940 m || 
|-id=135 bgcolor=#fefefe
| 175135 ||  || — || February 1, 2005 || Kitt Peak || Spacewatch || FLO || align=right data-sort-value="0.90" | 900 m || 
|-id=136 bgcolor=#E9E9E9
| 175136 ||  || — || February 28, 2005 || Goodricke-Pigott || R. A. Tucker || — || align=right | 1.7 km || 
|-id=137 bgcolor=#fefefe
| 175137 ||  || — || March 1, 2005 || Kitt Peak || Spacewatch || — || align=right | 1.3 km || 
|-id=138 bgcolor=#fefefe
| 175138 ||  || — || March 1, 2005 || Kitt Peak || Spacewatch || — || align=right | 1.8 km || 
|-id=139 bgcolor=#fefefe
| 175139 ||  || — || March 2, 2005 || Kitt Peak || Spacewatch || NYS || align=right data-sort-value="0.81" | 810 m || 
|-id=140 bgcolor=#E9E9E9
| 175140 ||  || — || March 2, 2005 || Kitt Peak || Spacewatch || — || align=right | 3.7 km || 
|-id=141 bgcolor=#fefefe
| 175141 ||  || — || March 3, 2005 || Kitt Peak || Spacewatch || FLO || align=right data-sort-value="0.97" | 970 m || 
|-id=142 bgcolor=#fefefe
| 175142 ||  || — || March 3, 2005 || Kitt Peak || Spacewatch || FLO || align=right data-sort-value="0.96" | 960 m || 
|-id=143 bgcolor=#fefefe
| 175143 ||  || — || March 3, 2005 || Kitt Peak || Spacewatch || — || align=right | 2.1 km || 
|-id=144 bgcolor=#fefefe
| 175144 ||  || — || March 3, 2005 || Kitt Peak || Spacewatch || — || align=right data-sort-value="0.91" | 910 m || 
|-id=145 bgcolor=#fefefe
| 175145 ||  || — || March 3, 2005 || Catalina || CSS || — || align=right | 1.5 km || 
|-id=146 bgcolor=#fefefe
| 175146 ||  || — || March 3, 2005 || Catalina || CSS || — || align=right | 1.2 km || 
|-id=147 bgcolor=#fefefe
| 175147 ||  || — || March 3, 2005 || Catalina || CSS || V || align=right | 1.1 km || 
|-id=148 bgcolor=#fefefe
| 175148 ||  || — || March 1, 2005 || Needville || Needville Obs. || NYS || align=right data-sort-value="0.97" | 970 m || 
|-id=149 bgcolor=#fefefe
| 175149 ||  || — || March 3, 2005 || Catalina || CSS || — || align=right data-sort-value="0.98" | 980 m || 
|-id=150 bgcolor=#fefefe
| 175150 ||  || — || March 4, 2005 || Kitt Peak || Spacewatch || NYS || align=right data-sort-value="0.78" | 780 m || 
|-id=151 bgcolor=#fefefe
| 175151 ||  || — || March 3, 2005 || Catalina || CSS || — || align=right | 1.2 km || 
|-id=152 bgcolor=#fefefe
| 175152 Marthafarkas ||  ||  || March 3, 2005 || Jarnac || T. Glinos, D. H. Levy || V || align=right | 1.1 km || 
|-id=153 bgcolor=#fefefe
| 175153 ||  || — || March 3, 2005 || Catalina || CSS || — || align=right | 1.4 km || 
|-id=154 bgcolor=#fefefe
| 175154 ||  || — || March 3, 2005 || Kitt Peak || Spacewatch || NYS || align=right data-sort-value="0.96" | 960 m || 
|-id=155 bgcolor=#fefefe
| 175155 ||  || — || March 4, 2005 || Kitt Peak || Spacewatch || NYS || align=right | 1.1 km || 
|-id=156 bgcolor=#fefefe
| 175156 ||  || — || March 4, 2005 || Catalina || CSS || — || align=right | 1.0 km || 
|-id=157 bgcolor=#fefefe
| 175157 ||  || — || March 4, 2005 || Catalina || CSS || — || align=right | 1.1 km || 
|-id=158 bgcolor=#fefefe
| 175158 ||  || — || March 4, 2005 || Catalina || CSS || — || align=right | 1.5 km || 
|-id=159 bgcolor=#fefefe
| 175159 ||  || — || March 7, 2005 || Socorro || LINEAR || — || align=right | 1.1 km || 
|-id=160 bgcolor=#fefefe
| 175160 ||  || — || March 7, 2005 || Socorro || LINEAR || FLO || align=right data-sort-value="0.96" | 960 m || 
|-id=161 bgcolor=#fefefe
| 175161 ||  || — || March 2, 2005 || Catalina || CSS || V || align=right | 1.1 km || 
|-id=162 bgcolor=#E9E9E9
| 175162 ||  || — || March 3, 2005 || Catalina || CSS || — || align=right | 1.5 km || 
|-id=163 bgcolor=#fefefe
| 175163 ||  || — || March 4, 2005 || Socorro || LINEAR || V || align=right data-sort-value="0.93" | 930 m || 
|-id=164 bgcolor=#fefefe
| 175164 ||  || — || March 4, 2005 || Socorro || LINEAR || NYS || align=right data-sort-value="0.90" | 900 m || 
|-id=165 bgcolor=#fefefe
| 175165 ||  || — || March 4, 2005 || Socorro || LINEAR || FLO || align=right | 1.1 km || 
|-id=166 bgcolor=#E9E9E9
| 175166 Adirondack ||  ||  || March 3, 2005 || Jarnac || Jarnac Obs. || — || align=right | 1.5 km || 
|-id=167 bgcolor=#fefefe
| 175167 ||  || — || March 3, 2005 || Catalina || CSS || FLO || align=right | 1.1 km || 
|-id=168 bgcolor=#FA8072
| 175168 ||  || — || March 7, 2005 || Socorro || LINEAR || — || align=right | 1.4 km || 
|-id=169 bgcolor=#fefefe
| 175169 ||  || — || March 7, 2005 || Siding Spring || SSS || — || align=right | 1.6 km || 
|-id=170 bgcolor=#fefefe
| 175170 ||  || — || March 9, 2005 || Anderson Mesa || LONEOS || — || align=right data-sort-value="0.87" | 870 m || 
|-id=171 bgcolor=#fefefe
| 175171 ||  || — || March 9, 2005 || Socorro || LINEAR || — || align=right | 1.1 km || 
|-id=172 bgcolor=#fefefe
| 175172 ||  || — || March 9, 2005 || Mount Lemmon || Mount Lemmon Survey || — || align=right data-sort-value="0.86" | 860 m || 
|-id=173 bgcolor=#d6d6d6
| 175173 ||  || — || March 9, 2005 || Mount Lemmon || Mount Lemmon Survey || — || align=right | 3.9 km || 
|-id=174 bgcolor=#fefefe
| 175174 ||  || — || March 10, 2005 || Catalina || CSS || V || align=right data-sort-value="0.92" | 920 m || 
|-id=175 bgcolor=#fefefe
| 175175 ||  || — || March 10, 2005 || Catalina || CSS || — || align=right | 1.3 km || 
|-id=176 bgcolor=#d6d6d6
| 175176 ||  || — || March 10, 2005 || Mount Lemmon || Mount Lemmon Survey || K-2 || align=right | 2.2 km || 
|-id=177 bgcolor=#E9E9E9
| 175177 ||  || — || March 9, 2005 || Catalina || CSS || GER || align=right | 2.8 km || 
|-id=178 bgcolor=#fefefe
| 175178 ||  || — || March 8, 2005 || Mount Lemmon || Mount Lemmon Survey || — || align=right | 1.0 km || 
|-id=179 bgcolor=#fefefe
| 175179 ||  || — || March 9, 2005 || Mount Lemmon || Mount Lemmon Survey || V || align=right | 1.0 km || 
|-id=180 bgcolor=#fefefe
| 175180 ||  || — || March 9, 2005 || Mount Lemmon || Mount Lemmon Survey || — || align=right | 1.1 km || 
|-id=181 bgcolor=#E9E9E9
| 175181 ||  || — || March 10, 2005 || Mount Lemmon || Mount Lemmon Survey || — || align=right | 2.5 km || 
|-id=182 bgcolor=#fefefe
| 175182 ||  || — || March 8, 2005 || Anderson Mesa || LONEOS || — || align=right | 1.1 km || 
|-id=183 bgcolor=#E9E9E9
| 175183 ||  || — || March 8, 2005 || Mount Lemmon || Mount Lemmon Survey || — || align=right | 2.6 km || 
|-id=184 bgcolor=#fefefe
| 175184 ||  || — || March 8, 2005 || Mount Lemmon || Mount Lemmon Survey || — || align=right | 1.2 km || 
|-id=185 bgcolor=#fefefe
| 175185 ||  || — || March 8, 2005 || Socorro || LINEAR || — || align=right | 4.1 km || 
|-id=186 bgcolor=#E9E9E9
| 175186 ||  || — || March 4, 2005 || Catalina || CSS || — || align=right | 2.3 km || 
|-id=187 bgcolor=#fefefe
| 175187 ||  || — || March 7, 2005 || Socorro || LINEAR || ERI || align=right | 1.8 km || 
|-id=188 bgcolor=#fefefe
| 175188 ||  || — || March 8, 2005 || Mount Lemmon || Mount Lemmon Survey || MAS || align=right data-sort-value="0.75" | 750 m || 
|-id=189 bgcolor=#FFC2E0
| 175189 ||  || — || March 11, 2005 || Mount Lemmon || Mount Lemmon Survey || AMO || align=right data-sort-value="0.76" | 760 m || 
|-id=190 bgcolor=#fefefe
| 175190 ||  || — || March 10, 2005 || Anderson Mesa || LONEOS || V || align=right data-sort-value="0.95" | 950 m || 
|-id=191 bgcolor=#fefefe
| 175191 ||  || — || March 11, 2005 || Catalina || CSS || V || align=right data-sort-value="0.91" | 910 m || 
|-id=192 bgcolor=#fefefe
| 175192 ||  || — || March 11, 2005 || Catalina || CSS || — || align=right | 1.5 km || 
|-id=193 bgcolor=#fefefe
| 175193 ||  || — || March 11, 2005 || Catalina || CSS || V || align=right | 1.1 km || 
|-id=194 bgcolor=#fefefe
| 175194 ||  || — || March 14, 2005 || Mount Lemmon || Mount Lemmon Survey || CIM || align=right | 4.9 km || 
|-id=195 bgcolor=#fefefe
| 175195 ||  || — || March 12, 2005 || Socorro || LINEAR || V || align=right | 1.0 km || 
|-id=196 bgcolor=#E9E9E9
| 175196 ||  || — || March 8, 2005 || Socorro || LINEAR || — || align=right | 2.3 km || 
|-id=197 bgcolor=#fefefe
| 175197 ||  || — || March 8, 2005 || Kitt Peak || Spacewatch || — || align=right | 1.2 km || 
|-id=198 bgcolor=#fefefe
| 175198 ||  || — || March 10, 2005 || Catalina || CSS || — || align=right | 1.0 km || 
|-id=199 bgcolor=#fefefe
| 175199 ||  || — || March 10, 2005 || Calvin-Rehoboth || Calvin–Rehoboth Obs. || — || align=right data-sort-value="0.86" | 860 m || 
|-id=200 bgcolor=#fefefe
| 175200 ||  || — || March 11, 2005 || Kitt Peak || Spacewatch || MAS || align=right | 1.3 km || 
|}

175201–175300 

|-bgcolor=#E9E9E9
| 175201 ||  || — || March 13, 2005 || Anderson Mesa || LONEOS || MIT || align=right | 4.0 km || 
|-id=202 bgcolor=#fefefe
| 175202 ||  || — || March 16, 2005 || Mount Lemmon || Mount Lemmon Survey || — || align=right data-sort-value="0.85" | 850 m || 
|-id=203 bgcolor=#fefefe
| 175203 Kingston ||  ||  || March 31, 2005 || Jarnac || Jarnac Obs. || V || align=right | 1.1 km || 
|-id=204 bgcolor=#E9E9E9
| 175204 Gregbyrne ||  ||  || March 31, 2005 || Goodricke-Pigott || V. Reddy || GEF || align=right | 2.6 km || 
|-id=205 bgcolor=#fefefe
| 175205 ||  || — || April 1, 2005 || Kitt Peak || Spacewatch || — || align=right | 1.2 km || 
|-id=206 bgcolor=#d6d6d6
| 175206 ||  || — || April 1, 2005 || Anderson Mesa || LONEOS || NAE || align=right | 4.7 km || 
|-id=207 bgcolor=#d6d6d6
| 175207 ||  || — || April 1, 2005 || Anderson Mesa || LONEOS || EOS || align=right | 3.6 km || 
|-id=208 bgcolor=#fefefe
| 175208 Vorbourg ||  ||  || April 1, 2005 || Vicques || M. Ory || — || align=right | 1.4 km || 
|-id=209 bgcolor=#fefefe
| 175209 ||  || — || April 3, 2005 || Palomar || NEAT || — || align=right | 1.0 km || 
|-id=210 bgcolor=#fefefe
| 175210 ||  || — || April 3, 2005 || Siding Spring || SSS || — || align=right | 1.2 km || 
|-id=211 bgcolor=#fefefe
| 175211 ||  || — || April 4, 2005 || Kitt Peak || Spacewatch || — || align=right | 1.7 km || 
|-id=212 bgcolor=#fefefe
| 175212 ||  || — || April 4, 2005 || Catalina || CSS || FLO || align=right | 1.1 km || 
|-id=213 bgcolor=#fefefe
| 175213 ||  || — || April 4, 2005 || Socorro || LINEAR || FLO || align=right | 1.1 km || 
|-id=214 bgcolor=#fefefe
| 175214 ||  || — || April 5, 2005 || Catalina || CSS || FLO || align=right | 1.2 km || 
|-id=215 bgcolor=#E9E9E9
| 175215 ||  || — || April 4, 2005 || Catalina || CSS || — || align=right | 1.2 km || 
|-id=216 bgcolor=#fefefe
| 175216 ||  || — || April 2, 2005 || Palomar || NEAT || — || align=right | 1.4 km || 
|-id=217 bgcolor=#fefefe
| 175217 ||  || — || April 4, 2005 || Catalina || CSS || — || align=right | 1.5 km || 
|-id=218 bgcolor=#E9E9E9
| 175218 ||  || — || April 2, 2005 || Catalina || CSS || — || align=right | 1.7 km || 
|-id=219 bgcolor=#E9E9E9
| 175219 ||  || — || April 2, 2005 || Catalina || CSS || — || align=right | 1.9 km || 
|-id=220 bgcolor=#fefefe
| 175220 ||  || — || April 6, 2005 || Catalina || CSS || — || align=right | 1.3 km || 
|-id=221 bgcolor=#fefefe
| 175221 ||  || — || April 7, 2005 || Kitt Peak || Spacewatch || — || align=right | 1.2 km || 
|-id=222 bgcolor=#E9E9E9
| 175222 ||  || — || April 7, 2005 || Kitt Peak || Spacewatch || — || align=right | 1.7 km || 
|-id=223 bgcolor=#fefefe
| 175223 ||  || — || April 9, 2005 || Socorro || LINEAR || NYS || align=right | 1.0 km || 
|-id=224 bgcolor=#fefefe
| 175224 ||  || — || April 10, 2005 || Kitt Peak || Spacewatch || FLO || align=right data-sort-value="0.85" | 850 m || 
|-id=225 bgcolor=#fefefe
| 175225 ||  || — || April 10, 2005 || Goodricke-Pigott || R. A. Tucker || — || align=right | 1.6 km || 
|-id=226 bgcolor=#fefefe
| 175226 ||  || — || April 5, 2005 || Mount Lemmon || Mount Lemmon Survey || V || align=right data-sort-value="0.71" | 710 m || 
|-id=227 bgcolor=#E9E9E9
| 175227 ||  || — || April 6, 2005 || Catalina || CSS || — || align=right | 2.9 km || 
|-id=228 bgcolor=#fefefe
| 175228 ||  || — || April 5, 2005 || Kitt Peak || Spacewatch || — || align=right | 1.4 km || 
|-id=229 bgcolor=#fefefe
| 175229 ||  || — || April 11, 2005 || Socorro || LINEAR || — || align=right | 1.4 km || 
|-id=230 bgcolor=#E9E9E9
| 175230 ||  || — || April 9, 2005 || Kitt Peak || Spacewatch || — || align=right | 3.6 km || 
|-id=231 bgcolor=#fefefe
| 175231 ||  || — || April 11, 2005 || Kitt Peak || Spacewatch || — || align=right | 1.4 km || 
|-id=232 bgcolor=#fefefe
| 175232 ||  || — || April 12, 2005 || Kitt Peak || Spacewatch || FLO || align=right data-sort-value="0.94" | 940 m || 
|-id=233 bgcolor=#E9E9E9
| 175233 ||  || — || April 7, 2005 || Anderson Mesa || LONEOS || — || align=right | 4.1 km || 
|-id=234 bgcolor=#fefefe
| 175234 ||  || — || April 10, 2005 || Mount Lemmon || Mount Lemmon Survey || — || align=right | 2.6 km || 
|-id=235 bgcolor=#fefefe
| 175235 ||  || — || April 11, 2005 || Anderson Mesa || LONEOS || — || align=right | 1.0 km || 
|-id=236 bgcolor=#fefefe
| 175236 ||  || — || April 13, 2005 || Catalina || CSS || — || align=right | 1.4 km || 
|-id=237 bgcolor=#E9E9E9
| 175237 ||  || — || April 13, 2005 || Kitt Peak || Spacewatch || — || align=right | 3.4 km || 
|-id=238 bgcolor=#fefefe
| 175238 Nguyenhien ||  ||  || April 12, 2005 || Kitt Peak || M. W. Buie || MAS || align=right | 1.1 km || 
|-id=239 bgcolor=#E9E9E9
| 175239 ||  || — || April 4, 2005 || Catalina || CSS || — || align=right | 1.5 km || 
|-id=240 bgcolor=#E9E9E9
| 175240 ||  || — || April 14, 2005 || Catalina || CSS || — || align=right | 1.8 km || 
|-id=241 bgcolor=#E9E9E9
| 175241 || 2005 HQ || — || April 16, 2005 || Kitt Peak || Spacewatch || — || align=right | 1.4 km || 
|-id=242 bgcolor=#E9E9E9
| 175242 ||  || — || April 17, 2005 || Siding Spring || SSS || — || align=right | 4.2 km || 
|-id=243 bgcolor=#fefefe
| 175243 ||  || — || May 1, 2005 || Kitt Peak || Spacewatch || — || align=right | 1.5 km || 
|-id=244 bgcolor=#fefefe
| 175244 ||  || — || May 2, 2005 || Kitt Peak || Spacewatch || NYS || align=right data-sort-value="0.95" | 950 m || 
|-id=245 bgcolor=#E9E9E9
| 175245 ||  || — || May 3, 2005 || Kitt Peak || Spacewatch || — || align=right | 1.1 km || 
|-id=246 bgcolor=#fefefe
| 175246 ||  || — || May 4, 2005 || Kitt Peak || Spacewatch || V || align=right | 1.1 km || 
|-id=247 bgcolor=#fefefe
| 175247 ||  || — || May 4, 2005 || Siding Spring || SSS || — || align=right data-sort-value="0.86" | 860 m || 
|-id=248 bgcolor=#fefefe
| 175248 ||  || — || May 3, 2005 || Kitt Peak || Spacewatch || — || align=right | 1.2 km || 
|-id=249 bgcolor=#fefefe
| 175249 ||  || — || May 3, 2005 || Socorro || LINEAR || — || align=right | 1.2 km || 
|-id=250 bgcolor=#E9E9E9
| 175250 ||  || — || May 3, 2005 || Socorro || LINEAR || — || align=right | 4.2 km || 
|-id=251 bgcolor=#fefefe
| 175251 ||  || — || May 4, 2005 || Palomar || NEAT || V || align=right | 1.0 km || 
|-id=252 bgcolor=#E9E9E9
| 175252 ||  || — || May 3, 2005 || Kitt Peak || Spacewatch || — || align=right | 2.3 km || 
|-id=253 bgcolor=#E9E9E9
| 175253 ||  || — || May 4, 2005 || Kitt Peak || Spacewatch || — || align=right | 1.9 km || 
|-id=254 bgcolor=#d6d6d6
| 175254 ||  || — || May 4, 2005 || Kitt Peak || Spacewatch || HYG || align=right | 4.1 km || 
|-id=255 bgcolor=#fefefe
| 175255 ||  || — || May 11, 2005 || RAS || A. Lowe || V || align=right data-sort-value="0.93" | 930 m || 
|-id=256 bgcolor=#d6d6d6
| 175256 ||  || — || May 4, 2005 || Catalina || CSS || TIR || align=right | 4.6 km || 
|-id=257 bgcolor=#E9E9E9
| 175257 ||  || — || May 12, 2005 || RAS || A. Lowe || — || align=right | 2.1 km || 
|-id=258 bgcolor=#fefefe
| 175258 ||  || — || May 8, 2005 || Kitt Peak || Spacewatch || MAS || align=right data-sort-value="0.90" | 900 m || 
|-id=259 bgcolor=#d6d6d6
| 175259 Offenberger ||  ||  || May 10, 2005 || Saint-Sulpice || B. Christophe || LIX || align=right | 5.9 km || 
|-id=260 bgcolor=#fefefe
| 175260 ||  || — || May 11, 2005 || Palomar || NEAT || NYS || align=right | 1.1 km || 
|-id=261 bgcolor=#E9E9E9
| 175261 ||  || — || May 9, 2005 || Catalina || CSS || MAR || align=right | 1.8 km || 
|-id=262 bgcolor=#E9E9E9
| 175262 ||  || — || May 9, 2005 || Kitt Peak || Spacewatch || — || align=right | 2.3 km || 
|-id=263 bgcolor=#fefefe
| 175263 ||  || — || May 9, 2005 || Kitt Peak || Spacewatch || — || align=right | 1.4 km || 
|-id=264 bgcolor=#fefefe
| 175264 ||  || — || May 9, 2005 || Catalina || CSS || — || align=right | 1.3 km || 
|-id=265 bgcolor=#E9E9E9
| 175265 ||  || — || May 10, 2005 || Mount Lemmon || Mount Lemmon Survey || — || align=right | 1.2 km || 
|-id=266 bgcolor=#E9E9E9
| 175266 ||  || — || May 12, 2005 || Socorro || LINEAR || — || align=right | 2.0 km || 
|-id=267 bgcolor=#E9E9E9
| 175267 ||  || — || May 11, 2005 || Catalina || CSS || — || align=right | 2.7 km || 
|-id=268 bgcolor=#E9E9E9
| 175268 ||  || — || May 14, 2005 || Socorro || LINEAR || — || align=right | 4.0 km || 
|-id=269 bgcolor=#fefefe
| 175269 ||  || — || May 15, 2005 || Mount Lemmon || Mount Lemmon Survey || MAS || align=right | 1.0 km || 
|-id=270 bgcolor=#fefefe
| 175270 ||  || — || May 15, 2005 || Mount Lemmon || Mount Lemmon Survey || NYS || align=right | 1.0 km || 
|-id=271 bgcolor=#fefefe
| 175271 ||  || — || May 12, 2005 || Palomar || NEAT || — || align=right | 1.2 km || 
|-id=272 bgcolor=#d6d6d6
| 175272 ||  || — || May 4, 2005 || Palomar || NEAT || — || align=right | 3.9 km || 
|-id=273 bgcolor=#fefefe
| 175273 ||  || — || May 6, 2005 || Catalina || CSS || — || align=right | 1.0 km || 
|-id=274 bgcolor=#fefefe
| 175274 ||  || — || May 7, 2005 || Kitt Peak || Spacewatch || — || align=right | 1.1 km || 
|-id=275 bgcolor=#E9E9E9
| 175275 ||  || — || May 10, 2005 || Mount Lemmon || Mount Lemmon Survey || — || align=right | 2.9 km || 
|-id=276 bgcolor=#E9E9E9
| 175276 ||  || — || May 14, 2005 || Palomar || NEAT || WIT || align=right | 1.8 km || 
|-id=277 bgcolor=#E9E9E9
| 175277 ||  || — || May 7, 2005 || Catalina || CSS || — || align=right | 4.3 km || 
|-id=278 bgcolor=#E9E9E9
| 175278 ||  || — || May 17, 2005 || Mount Lemmon || Mount Lemmon Survey || — || align=right | 2.8 km || 
|-id=279 bgcolor=#E9E9E9
| 175279 ||  || — || May 18, 2005 || Palomar || NEAT || — || align=right | 2.3 km || 
|-id=280 bgcolor=#fefefe
| 175280 ||  || — || May 19, 2005 || Siding Spring || SSS || V || align=right | 1.2 km || 
|-id=281 bgcolor=#d6d6d6
| 175281 Kolonics ||  ||  || May 28, 2005 || Piszkéstető || K. Sárneczky || EOS || align=right | 2.5 km || 
|-id=282 bgcolor=#E9E9E9
| 175282 Benhida || 2005 LA ||  || June 1, 2005 || Vicques || M. Ory || — || align=right | 2.6 km || 
|-id=283 bgcolor=#E9E9E9
| 175283 || 2005 LJ || — || June 1, 2005 || Mount Lemmon || Mount Lemmon Survey || WIT || align=right | 1.3 km || 
|-id=284 bgcolor=#fefefe
| 175284 ||  || — || June 2, 2005 || Catalina || CSS || — || align=right | 1.6 km || 
|-id=285 bgcolor=#E9E9E9
| 175285 ||  || — || June 3, 2005 || Reedy Creek || J. Broughton || — || align=right | 3.1 km || 
|-id=286 bgcolor=#fefefe
| 175286 ||  || — || June 1, 2005 || Kitt Peak || Spacewatch || NYS || align=right data-sort-value="0.86" | 860 m || 
|-id=287 bgcolor=#E9E9E9
| 175287 ||  || — || June 3, 2005 || Kitt Peak || Spacewatch || — || align=right | 3.8 km || 
|-id=288 bgcolor=#fefefe
| 175288 ||  || — || June 4, 2005 || Catalina || CSS || NYS || align=right data-sort-value="0.91" | 910 m || 
|-id=289 bgcolor=#E9E9E9
| 175289 ||  || — || June 5, 2005 || Kitt Peak || Spacewatch || — || align=right | 2.6 km || 
|-id=290 bgcolor=#fefefe
| 175290 ||  || — || June 6, 2005 || Kitt Peak || Spacewatch || MAS || align=right data-sort-value="0.90" | 900 m || 
|-id=291 bgcolor=#E9E9E9
| 175291 ||  || — || June 8, 2005 || Kitt Peak || Spacewatch || — || align=right | 1.3 km || 
|-id=292 bgcolor=#d6d6d6
| 175292 ||  || — || June 8, 2005 || Kitt Peak || Spacewatch || THM || align=right | 3.9 km || 
|-id=293 bgcolor=#E9E9E9
| 175293 ||  || — || June 8, 2005 || Kitt Peak || Spacewatch || GEF || align=right | 2.1 km || 
|-id=294 bgcolor=#E9E9E9
| 175294 ||  || — || June 8, 2005 || Kitt Peak || Spacewatch || — || align=right | 2.8 km || 
|-id=295 bgcolor=#d6d6d6
| 175295 ||  || — || June 9, 2005 || Kitt Peak || Spacewatch || HYG || align=right | 3.4 km || 
|-id=296 bgcolor=#d6d6d6
| 175296 ||  || — || June 12, 2005 || Kitt Peak || Spacewatch || — || align=right | 3.8 km || 
|-id=297 bgcolor=#E9E9E9
| 175297 ||  || — || June 10, 2005 || Kitt Peak || Spacewatch || — || align=right | 1.7 km || 
|-id=298 bgcolor=#E9E9E9
| 175298 ||  || — || June 11, 2005 || Kitt Peak || Spacewatch || — || align=right | 1.5 km || 
|-id=299 bgcolor=#fefefe
| 175299 ||  || — || June 14, 2005 || Kitt Peak || Spacewatch || NYS || align=right data-sort-value="0.99" | 990 m || 
|-id=300 bgcolor=#d6d6d6
| 175300 ||  || — || June 11, 2005 || Catalina || CSS || EUP || align=right | 7.9 km || 
|}

175301–175400 

|-bgcolor=#d6d6d6
| 175301 ||  || — || June 13, 2005 || Mount Lemmon || Mount Lemmon Survey || ALA || align=right | 6.9 km || 
|-id=302 bgcolor=#fefefe
| 175302 ||  || — || June 10, 2005 || Kitt Peak || Spacewatch || — || align=right | 1.1 km || 
|-id=303 bgcolor=#fefefe
| 175303 ||  || — || June 13, 2005 || Mount Lemmon || Mount Lemmon Survey || — || align=right | 1.2 km || 
|-id=304 bgcolor=#d6d6d6
| 175304 ||  || — || June 21, 2005 || Palomar || NEAT || — || align=right | 4.9 km || 
|-id=305 bgcolor=#E9E9E9
| 175305 ||  || — || June 24, 2005 || Palomar || NEAT || — || align=right | 1.9 km || 
|-id=306 bgcolor=#E9E9E9
| 175306 ||  || — || June 24, 2005 || Palomar || NEAT || GEF || align=right | 1.8 km || 
|-id=307 bgcolor=#E9E9E9
| 175307 ||  || — || June 26, 2005 || Mount Lemmon || Mount Lemmon Survey || HEN || align=right | 1.6 km || 
|-id=308 bgcolor=#fefefe
| 175308 ||  || — || June 27, 2005 || Mount Lemmon || Mount Lemmon Survey || MAS || align=right | 1.1 km || 
|-id=309 bgcolor=#fefefe
| 175309 ||  || — || June 27, 2005 || Mount Lemmon || Mount Lemmon Survey || MAS || align=right | 1.1 km || 
|-id=310 bgcolor=#d6d6d6
| 175310 ||  || — || June 23, 2005 || Palomar || NEAT || — || align=right | 5.1 km || 
|-id=311 bgcolor=#E9E9E9
| 175311 ||  || — || June 27, 2005 || Kitt Peak || Spacewatch || — || align=right | 3.6 km || 
|-id=312 bgcolor=#d6d6d6
| 175312 ||  || — || June 27, 2005 || Kitt Peak || Spacewatch || — || align=right | 3.4 km || 
|-id=313 bgcolor=#d6d6d6
| 175313 ||  || — || June 29, 2005 || Palomar || NEAT || — || align=right | 5.2 km || 
|-id=314 bgcolor=#E9E9E9
| 175314 ||  || — || June 29, 2005 || Palomar || NEAT || — || align=right | 3.5 km || 
|-id=315 bgcolor=#fefefe
| 175315 ||  || — || June 29, 2005 || Kitt Peak || Spacewatch || FLO || align=right data-sort-value="0.95" | 950 m || 
|-id=316 bgcolor=#E9E9E9
| 175316 ||  || — || June 30, 2005 || Kitt Peak || Spacewatch || — || align=right | 4.1 km || 
|-id=317 bgcolor=#fefefe
| 175317 ||  || — || June 23, 2005 || Palomar || NEAT || — || align=right | 1.5 km || 
|-id=318 bgcolor=#E9E9E9
| 175318 ||  || — || June 28, 2005 || Kitt Peak || Spacewatch || — || align=right | 2.3 km || 
|-id=319 bgcolor=#d6d6d6
| 175319 ||  || — || June 28, 2005 || Palomar || NEAT || — || align=right | 4.7 km || 
|-id=320 bgcolor=#d6d6d6
| 175320 ||  || — || June 30, 2005 || Kitt Peak || Spacewatch || EOS || align=right | 2.5 km || 
|-id=321 bgcolor=#E9E9E9
| 175321 ||  || — || June 30, 2005 || Kitt Peak || Spacewatch || AGN || align=right | 1.8 km || 
|-id=322 bgcolor=#d6d6d6
| 175322 ||  || — || June 30, 2005 || Kitt Peak || Spacewatch || KOR || align=right | 1.8 km || 
|-id=323 bgcolor=#d6d6d6
| 175323 ||  || — || June 30, 2005 || Palomar || NEAT || — || align=right | 4.6 km || 
|-id=324 bgcolor=#d6d6d6
| 175324 ||  || — || June 29, 2005 || Palomar || NEAT || — || align=right | 4.6 km || 
|-id=325 bgcolor=#d6d6d6
| 175325 ||  || — || July 1, 2005 || Kitt Peak || Spacewatch || — || align=right | 4.7 km || 
|-id=326 bgcolor=#d6d6d6
| 175326 ||  || — || July 3, 2005 || Mount Lemmon || Mount Lemmon Survey || — || align=right | 3.7 km || 
|-id=327 bgcolor=#E9E9E9
| 175327 ||  || — || July 4, 2005 || Mount Lemmon || Mount Lemmon Survey || — || align=right | 3.4 km || 
|-id=328 bgcolor=#d6d6d6
| 175328 ||  || — || July 2, 2005 || Kitt Peak || Spacewatch || — || align=right | 5.8 km || 
|-id=329 bgcolor=#d6d6d6
| 175329 ||  || — || July 4, 2005 || Mount Lemmon || Mount Lemmon Survey || — || align=right | 3.9 km || 
|-id=330 bgcolor=#d6d6d6
| 175330 ||  || — || July 5, 2005 || Kitt Peak || Spacewatch || — || align=right | 4.7 km || 
|-id=331 bgcolor=#d6d6d6
| 175331 ||  || — || July 5, 2005 || Kitt Peak || Spacewatch || — || align=right | 3.2 km || 
|-id=332 bgcolor=#E9E9E9
| 175332 ||  || — || July 5, 2005 || Kitt Peak || Spacewatch || — || align=right | 1.7 km || 
|-id=333 bgcolor=#E9E9E9
| 175333 ||  || — || July 6, 2005 || Kitt Peak || Spacewatch || AGN || align=right | 1.9 km || 
|-id=334 bgcolor=#d6d6d6
| 175334 ||  || — || July 6, 2005 || Kitt Peak || Spacewatch || EOS || align=right | 2.8 km || 
|-id=335 bgcolor=#d6d6d6
| 175335 ||  || — || July 7, 2005 || Reedy Creek || J. Broughton || EOS || align=right | 3.5 km || 
|-id=336 bgcolor=#d6d6d6
| 175336 ||  || — || July 3, 2005 || Mount Lemmon || Mount Lemmon Survey || — || align=right | 3.3 km || 
|-id=337 bgcolor=#d6d6d6
| 175337 ||  || — || July 5, 2005 || Mount Lemmon || Mount Lemmon Survey || — || align=right | 3.1 km || 
|-id=338 bgcolor=#d6d6d6
| 175338 ||  || — || July 9, 2005 || Kitt Peak || Spacewatch || — || align=right | 4.0 km || 
|-id=339 bgcolor=#E9E9E9
| 175339 ||  || — || July 2, 2005 || Kitt Peak || Spacewatch || — || align=right | 1.6 km || 
|-id=340 bgcolor=#fefefe
| 175340 ||  || — || July 5, 2005 || Palomar || NEAT || — || align=right | 1.5 km || 
|-id=341 bgcolor=#d6d6d6
| 175341 ||  || — || July 9, 2005 || Kitt Peak || Spacewatch || KOR || align=right | 1.9 km || 
|-id=342 bgcolor=#fefefe
| 175342 ||  || — || July 12, 2005 || Bergisch Gladbach || W. Bickel || — || align=right | 1.6 km || 
|-id=343 bgcolor=#d6d6d6
| 175343 ||  || — || July 4, 2005 || Kitt Peak || Spacewatch || — || align=right | 2.8 km || 
|-id=344 bgcolor=#E9E9E9
| 175344 ||  || — || July 5, 2005 || Mount Lemmon || Mount Lemmon Survey || — || align=right | 1.3 km || 
|-id=345 bgcolor=#d6d6d6
| 175345 ||  || — || July 7, 2005 || Mauna Kea || C. Veillet || — || align=right | 3.3 km || 
|-id=346 bgcolor=#d6d6d6
| 175346 ||  || — || July 12, 2005 || Catalina || CSS || EOS || align=right | 3.8 km || 
|-id=347 bgcolor=#d6d6d6
| 175347 ||  || — || July 4, 2005 || Palomar || NEAT || VER || align=right | 5.4 km || 
|-id=348 bgcolor=#d6d6d6
| 175348 ||  || — || July 28, 2005 || Socorro || LINEAR || ALA || align=right | 8.5 km || 
|-id=349 bgcolor=#d6d6d6
| 175349 ||  || — || July 28, 2005 || Palomar || NEAT || — || align=right | 3.5 km || 
|-id=350 bgcolor=#d6d6d6
| 175350 ||  || — || July 29, 2005 || Palomar || NEAT || 3:2 || align=right | 7.6 km || 
|-id=351 bgcolor=#d6d6d6
| 175351 ||  || — || July 30, 2005 || Siding Spring || SSS || HIL3:2 || align=right | 10 km || 
|-id=352 bgcolor=#d6d6d6
| 175352 ||  || — || July 28, 2005 || Palomar || NEAT || — || align=right | 5.0 km || 
|-id=353 bgcolor=#E9E9E9
| 175353 ||  || — || July 28, 2005 || Palomar || NEAT || — || align=right | 4.5 km || 
|-id=354 bgcolor=#d6d6d6
| 175354 ||  || — || July 29, 2005 || Palomar || NEAT || ALA || align=right | 6.7 km || 
|-id=355 bgcolor=#d6d6d6
| 175355 ||  || — || August 6, 2005 || Palomar || NEAT || 3:2 || align=right | 6.6 km || 
|-id=356 bgcolor=#d6d6d6
| 175356 || 2005 QK || — || August 24, 2005 || Pla D'Arguines || R. Ferrando || — || align=right | 5.3 km || 
|-id=357 bgcolor=#E9E9E9
| 175357 ||  || — || August 22, 2005 || Palomar || NEAT || — || align=right | 3.8 km || 
|-id=358 bgcolor=#d6d6d6
| 175358 ||  || — || August 27, 2005 || Kitt Peak || Spacewatch || HYG || align=right | 4.8 km || 
|-id=359 bgcolor=#d6d6d6
| 175359 ||  || — || August 28, 2005 || Kitt Peak || Spacewatch || — || align=right | 3.3 km || 
|-id=360 bgcolor=#d6d6d6
| 175360 ||  || — || August 24, 2005 || Palomar || NEAT || HYG || align=right | 4.5 km || 
|-id=361 bgcolor=#d6d6d6
| 175361 ||  || — || August 26, 2005 || Palomar || NEAT || EOS || align=right | 3.8 km || 
|-id=362 bgcolor=#d6d6d6
| 175362 ||  || — || August 27, 2005 || Palomar || NEAT || HYG || align=right | 3.6 km || 
|-id=363 bgcolor=#d6d6d6
| 175363 ||  || — || August 27, 2005 || Palomar || NEAT || THM || align=right | 4.8 km || 
|-id=364 bgcolor=#d6d6d6
| 175364 ||  || — || August 28, 2005 || Kitt Peak || Spacewatch || — || align=right | 3.1 km || 
|-id=365 bgcolor=#d6d6d6
| 175365 Carsac ||  ||  || August 31, 2005 || Saint-Sulpice || B. Christophe || SYL7:4 || align=right | 6.2 km || 
|-id=366 bgcolor=#d6d6d6
| 175366 ||  || — || August 28, 2005 || Siding Spring || SSS || — || align=right | 5.9 km || 
|-id=367 bgcolor=#d6d6d6
| 175367 ||  || — || August 31, 2005 || Palomar || NEAT || HYG || align=right | 6.5 km || 
|-id=368 bgcolor=#d6d6d6
| 175368 ||  || — || September 1, 2005 || Kitt Peak || Spacewatch || THM || align=right | 2.8 km || 
|-id=369 bgcolor=#d6d6d6
| 175369 ||  || — || September 11, 2005 || Socorro || LINEAR || — || align=right | 3.9 km || 
|-id=370 bgcolor=#d6d6d6
| 175370 ||  || — || September 27, 2005 || Kitt Peak || Spacewatch || — || align=right | 4.1 km || 
|-id=371 bgcolor=#d6d6d6
| 175371 ||  || — || September 28, 2005 || Palomar || NEAT || 3:2 || align=right | 6.0 km || 
|-id=372 bgcolor=#d6d6d6
| 175372 ||  || — || September 30, 2005 || Kitt Peak || Spacewatch || 3:2 || align=right | 5.3 km || 
|-id=373 bgcolor=#d6d6d6
| 175373 ||  || — || September 29, 2005 || Mount Lemmon || Mount Lemmon Survey || THM || align=right | 2.9 km || 
|-id=374 bgcolor=#d6d6d6
| 175374 ||  || — || September 30, 2005 || Mount Lemmon || Mount Lemmon Survey || — || align=right | 3.5 km || 
|-id=375 bgcolor=#d6d6d6
| 175375 ||  || — || October 1, 2005 || Mount Lemmon || Mount Lemmon Survey || — || align=right | 4.4 km || 
|-id=376 bgcolor=#d6d6d6
| 175376 ||  || — || October 3, 2005 || Catalina || CSS || — || align=right | 4.3 km || 
|-id=377 bgcolor=#d6d6d6
| 175377 ||  || — || October 7, 2005 || Kitt Peak || Spacewatch || — || align=right | 4.9 km || 
|-id=378 bgcolor=#d6d6d6
| 175378 ||  || — || October 22, 2005 || Catalina || CSS || URS || align=right | 5.6 km || 
|-id=379 bgcolor=#d6d6d6
| 175379 ||  || — || October 26, 2005 || Socorro || LINEAR || — || align=right | 2.8 km || 
|-id=380 bgcolor=#fefefe
| 175380 ||  || — || April 30, 2006 || Catalina || CSS || — || align=right | 1.4 km || 
|-id=381 bgcolor=#E9E9E9
| 175381 ||  || — || April 30, 2006 || Catalina || CSS || — || align=right | 2.1 km || 
|-id=382 bgcolor=#fefefe
| 175382 ||  || — || May 2, 2006 || Mount Lemmon || Mount Lemmon Survey || NYS || align=right data-sort-value="0.98" | 980 m || 
|-id=383 bgcolor=#E9E9E9
| 175383 ||  || — || May 6, 2006 || Kitt Peak || Spacewatch || — || align=right | 3.2 km || 
|-id=384 bgcolor=#fefefe
| 175384 ||  || — || May 24, 2006 || Mount Lemmon || Mount Lemmon Survey || NYS || align=right | 1.1 km || 
|-id=385 bgcolor=#fefefe
| 175385 ||  || — || May 24, 2006 || Mount Lemmon || Mount Lemmon Survey || NYS || align=right | 1.2 km || 
|-id=386 bgcolor=#E9E9E9
| 175386 ||  || — || June 11, 2006 || Palomar || NEAT || — || align=right | 3.7 km || 
|-id=387 bgcolor=#fefefe
| 175387 ||  || — || June 10, 2006 || Palomar || NEAT || — || align=right | 3.2 km || 
|-id=388 bgcolor=#E9E9E9
| 175388 ||  || — || June 7, 2006 || Siding Spring || SSS || — || align=right | 4.2 km || 
|-id=389 bgcolor=#fefefe
| 175389 ||  || — || June 19, 2006 || Catalina || CSS || MAS || align=right | 1.5 km || 
|-id=390 bgcolor=#E9E9E9
| 175390 ||  || — || June 20, 2006 || Kitt Peak || Spacewatch || — || align=right | 3.4 km || 
|-id=391 bgcolor=#fefefe
| 175391 ||  || — || June 19, 2006 || Kitt Peak || Spacewatch || — || align=right | 1.5 km || 
|-id=392 bgcolor=#E9E9E9
| 175392 ||  || — || June 18, 2006 || Siding Spring || SSS || — || align=right | 4.2 km || 
|-id=393 bgcolor=#E9E9E9
| 175393 ||  || — || June 24, 2006 || Anderson Mesa || LONEOS || — || align=right | 5.6 km || 
|-id=394 bgcolor=#d6d6d6
| 175394 ||  || — || June 30, 2006 || Socorro || LINEAR || — || align=right | 6.3 km || 
|-id=395 bgcolor=#E9E9E9
| 175395 || 2006 NY || — || July 5, 2006 || Siding Spring || SSS || GER || align=right | 2.5 km || 
|-id=396 bgcolor=#E9E9E9
| 175396 ||  || — || July 18, 2006 || Socorro || LINEAR || — || align=right | 4.7 km || 
|-id=397 bgcolor=#E9E9E9
| 175397 ||  || — || July 21, 2006 || Mount Lemmon || Mount Lemmon Survey || — || align=right | 2.1 km || 
|-id=398 bgcolor=#E9E9E9
| 175398 ||  || — || July 18, 2006 || Mount Lemmon || Mount Lemmon Survey || — || align=right | 3.9 km || 
|-id=399 bgcolor=#fefefe
| 175399 ||  || — || July 18, 2006 || Mount Lemmon || Mount Lemmon Survey || NYS || align=right | 1.0 km || 
|-id=400 bgcolor=#fefefe
| 175400 ||  || — || July 19, 2006 || Palomar || NEAT || ERI || align=right | 2.4 km || 
|}

175401–175500 

|-bgcolor=#fefefe
| 175401 ||  || — || July 20, 2006 || Palomar || NEAT || NYS || align=right | 1.0 km || 
|-id=402 bgcolor=#fefefe
| 175402 ||  || — || July 25, 2006 || Ottmarsheim || C. Rinner || V || align=right data-sort-value="0.92" | 920 m || 
|-id=403 bgcolor=#fefefe
| 175403 ||  || — || July 19, 2006 || Palomar || NEAT || MAS || align=right | 1.3 km || 
|-id=404 bgcolor=#E9E9E9
| 175404 ||  || — || July 21, 2006 || Catalina || CSS || — || align=right | 4.0 km || 
|-id=405 bgcolor=#fefefe
| 175405 ||  || — || July 25, 2006 || Palomar || NEAT || FLO || align=right data-sort-value="0.86" | 860 m || 
|-id=406 bgcolor=#fefefe
| 175406 ||  || — || July 25, 2006 || Palomar || NEAT || NYS || align=right data-sort-value="0.81" | 810 m || 
|-id=407 bgcolor=#d6d6d6
| 175407 ||  || — || July 18, 2006 || Mount Lemmon || Mount Lemmon Survey || — || align=right | 4.2 km || 
|-id=408 bgcolor=#E9E9E9
| 175408 ||  || — || July 21, 2006 || Mount Lemmon || Mount Lemmon Survey || — || align=right | 1.4 km || 
|-id=409 bgcolor=#E9E9E9
| 175409 ||  || — || July 20, 2006 || Siding Spring || SSS || JUN || align=right | 1.6 km || 
|-id=410 bgcolor=#fefefe
| 175410 Tsayweanshun ||  ||  || August 12, 2006 || Lulin Observatory || H.-C. Lin, Q.-z. Ye || — || align=right | 1.4 km || 
|-id=411 bgcolor=#fefefe
| 175411 Yilan ||  ||  || August 12, 2006 || Lulin Observatory || H.-C. Lin, Q.-z. Ye || — || align=right | 1.5 km || 
|-id=412 bgcolor=#fefefe
| 175412 ||  || — || August 13, 2006 || Palomar || NEAT || NYS || align=right | 1.4 km || 
|-id=413 bgcolor=#fefefe
| 175413 ||  || — || August 13, 2006 || Palomar || NEAT || NYS || align=right | 1.9 km || 
|-id=414 bgcolor=#fefefe
| 175414 ||  || — || August 13, 2006 || Palomar || NEAT || — || align=right | 1.3 km || 
|-id=415 bgcolor=#fefefe
| 175415 ||  || — || August 13, 2006 || Palomar || NEAT || NYS || align=right | 1.1 km || 
|-id=416 bgcolor=#fefefe
| 175416 ||  || — || August 14, 2006 || Siding Spring || SSS || — || align=right | 1.4 km || 
|-id=417 bgcolor=#fefefe
| 175417 ||  || — || August 15, 2006 || Palomar || NEAT || — || align=right | 1.5 km || 
|-id=418 bgcolor=#d6d6d6
| 175418 ||  || — || August 15, 2006 || Palomar || NEAT || THM || align=right | 3.7 km || 
|-id=419 bgcolor=#d6d6d6
| 175419 Albiesachs ||  ||  || August 15, 2006 || Lulin Observatory || C.-S. Lin, Q.-z. Ye || HYG || align=right | 3.6 km || 
|-id=420 bgcolor=#E9E9E9
| 175420 ||  || — || August 15, 2006 || Palomar || NEAT || — || align=right | 2.2 km || 
|-id=421 bgcolor=#fefefe
| 175421 ||  || — || August 15, 2006 || Palomar || NEAT || NYS || align=right | 2.4 km || 
|-id=422 bgcolor=#fefefe
| 175422 ||  || — || August 12, 2006 || Palomar || NEAT || — || align=right | 1.2 km || 
|-id=423 bgcolor=#fefefe
| 175423 ||  || — || August 15, 2006 || Palomar || NEAT || NYS || align=right | 1.0 km || 
|-id=424 bgcolor=#fefefe
| 175424 ||  || — || August 12, 2006 || Palomar || NEAT || V || align=right data-sort-value="0.98" | 980 m || 
|-id=425 bgcolor=#E9E9E9
| 175425 ||  || — || August 6, 2006 || Anderson Mesa || LONEOS || — || align=right | 3.9 km || 
|-id=426 bgcolor=#E9E9E9
| 175426 ||  || — || August 15, 2006 || Palomar || NEAT || WIT || align=right | 1.5 km || 
|-id=427 bgcolor=#E9E9E9
| 175427 ||  || — || August 18, 2006 || Socorro || LINEAR || — || align=right | 3.2 km || 
|-id=428 bgcolor=#d6d6d6
| 175428 ||  || — || August 19, 2006 || Kitt Peak || Spacewatch || — || align=right | 4.6 km || 
|-id=429 bgcolor=#d6d6d6
| 175429 ||  || — || August 20, 2006 || Kitt Peak || Spacewatch || — || align=right | 5.1 km || 
|-id=430 bgcolor=#fefefe
| 175430 ||  || — || August 17, 2006 || Palomar || NEAT || MAS || align=right | 1.7 km || 
|-id=431 bgcolor=#fefefe
| 175431 ||  || — || August 18, 2006 || Anderson Mesa || LONEOS || FLO || align=right data-sort-value="0.92" | 920 m || 
|-id=432 bgcolor=#E9E9E9
| 175432 ||  || — || August 18, 2006 || Kitt Peak || Spacewatch || — || align=right | 2.0 km || 
|-id=433 bgcolor=#d6d6d6
| 175433 ||  || — || August 18, 2006 || Kitt Peak || Spacewatch || HYG || align=right | 4.8 km || 
|-id=434 bgcolor=#E9E9E9
| 175434 ||  || — || August 19, 2006 || Anderson Mesa || LONEOS || — || align=right | 1.3 km || 
|-id=435 bgcolor=#fefefe
| 175435 ||  || — || August 17, 2006 || Palomar || NEAT || — || align=right | 1.6 km || 
|-id=436 bgcolor=#fefefe
| 175436 ||  || — || August 19, 2006 || Palomar || NEAT || — || align=right | 1.2 km || 
|-id=437 bgcolor=#E9E9E9
| 175437 Zsivótzky ||  ||  || August 21, 2006 || Piszkéstető || K. Sárneczky, Z. Kuli || DOR || align=right | 3.7 km || 
|-id=438 bgcolor=#fefefe
| 175438 ||  || — || August 18, 2006 || Anderson Mesa || LONEOS || V || align=right | 1.6 km || 
|-id=439 bgcolor=#d6d6d6
| 175439 ||  || — || August 19, 2006 || Palomar || NEAT || — || align=right | 4.0 km || 
|-id=440 bgcolor=#d6d6d6
| 175440 ||  || — || August 21, 2006 || Kitt Peak || Spacewatch || — || align=right | 5.9 km || 
|-id=441 bgcolor=#d6d6d6
| 175441 ||  || — || August 17, 2006 || Palomar || NEAT || — || align=right | 6.6 km || 
|-id=442 bgcolor=#E9E9E9
| 175442 ||  || — || August 19, 2006 || Palomar || NEAT || — || align=right | 2.4 km || 
|-id=443 bgcolor=#fefefe
| 175443 ||  || — || August 19, 2006 || Anderson Mesa || LONEOS || NYS || align=right | 1.3 km || 
|-id=444 bgcolor=#fefefe
| 175444 ||  || — || August 21, 2006 || Socorro || LINEAR || — || align=right | 3.3 km || 
|-id=445 bgcolor=#E9E9E9
| 175445 ||  || — || August 21, 2006 || Socorro || LINEAR || — || align=right | 3.8 km || 
|-id=446 bgcolor=#fefefe
| 175446 ||  || — || August 21, 2006 || Palomar || NEAT || — || align=right | 1.7 km || 
|-id=447 bgcolor=#fefefe
| 175447 ||  || — || August 22, 2006 || Palomar || NEAT || V || align=right | 1.2 km || 
|-id=448 bgcolor=#E9E9E9
| 175448 ||  || — || August 22, 2006 || Palomar || NEAT || — || align=right | 3.4 km || 
|-id=449 bgcolor=#E9E9E9
| 175449 ||  || — || August 17, 2006 || Goodricke-Pigott || R. A. Tucker || EUN || align=right | 2.0 km || 
|-id=450 bgcolor=#fefefe
| 175450 Phillipklu ||  ||  || August 27, 2006 || Lulin Observatory || H.-C. Lin, Q.-z. Ye || — || align=right | 1.1 km || 
|-id=451 bgcolor=#d6d6d6
| 175451 Linchisheng ||  ||  || August 27, 2006 || Lulin Observatory || H.-C. Lin, Q.-z. Ye || HYG || align=right | 4.1 km || 
|-id=452 bgcolor=#fefefe
| 175452 Chenggong ||  ||  || August 27, 2006 || Lulin Observatory || H.-C. Lin, Q.-z. Ye || — || align=right | 1.2 km || 
|-id=453 bgcolor=#d6d6d6
| 175453 ||  || — || August 22, 2006 || Palomar || NEAT || EUP || align=right | 6.4 km || 
|-id=454 bgcolor=#fefefe
| 175454 ||  || — || August 24, 2006 || Socorro || LINEAR || V || align=right | 1.1 km || 
|-id=455 bgcolor=#E9E9E9
| 175455 ||  || — || August 27, 2006 || Kitt Peak || Spacewatch || — || align=right | 3.3 km || 
|-id=456 bgcolor=#fefefe
| 175456 ||  || — || August 27, 2006 || Kitt Peak || Spacewatch || — || align=right | 1.3 km || 
|-id=457 bgcolor=#fefefe
| 175457 ||  || — || August 27, 2006 || Kitt Peak || Spacewatch || — || align=right | 1.3 km || 
|-id=458 bgcolor=#fefefe
| 175458 ||  || — || August 17, 2006 || Palomar || NEAT || V || align=right | 1.1 km || 
|-id=459 bgcolor=#fefefe
| 175459 ||  || — || August 16, 2006 || Palomar || NEAT || — || align=right | 1.3 km || 
|-id=460 bgcolor=#d6d6d6
| 175460 ||  || — || August 16, 2006 || Palomar || NEAT || Tj (2.96) || align=right | 5.3 km || 
|-id=461 bgcolor=#E9E9E9
| 175461 ||  || — || August 16, 2006 || Palomar || NEAT || — || align=right | 2.0 km || 
|-id=462 bgcolor=#fefefe
| 175462 ||  || — || August 23, 2006 || Socorro || LINEAR || V || align=right | 1.1 km || 
|-id=463 bgcolor=#d6d6d6
| 175463 ||  || — || August 26, 2006 || Socorro || LINEAR || — || align=right | 6.6 km || 
|-id=464 bgcolor=#d6d6d6
| 175464 ||  || — || August 21, 2006 || Kitt Peak || Spacewatch || — || align=right | 3.7 km || 
|-id=465 bgcolor=#E9E9E9
| 175465 ||  || — || August 27, 2006 || Anderson Mesa || LONEOS || — || align=right | 2.5 km || 
|-id=466 bgcolor=#d6d6d6
| 175466 ||  || — || August 27, 2006 || Anderson Mesa || LONEOS || — || align=right | 3.9 km || 
|-id=467 bgcolor=#fefefe
| 175467 ||  || — || August 29, 2006 || Catalina || CSS || — || align=right | 1.1 km || 
|-id=468 bgcolor=#E9E9E9
| 175468 ||  || — || August 29, 2006 || Catalina || CSS || — || align=right | 2.3 km || 
|-id=469 bgcolor=#d6d6d6
| 175469 ||  || — || August 16, 2006 || Siding Spring || SSS || — || align=right | 9.1 km || 
|-id=470 bgcolor=#fefefe
| 175470 ||  || — || August 24, 2006 || Palomar || NEAT || — || align=right | 1.5 km || 
|-id=471 bgcolor=#C2FFFF
| 175471 ||  || — || August 16, 2006 || Palomar || NEAT || L4 || align=right | 13 km || 
|-id=472 bgcolor=#fefefe
| 175472 ||  || — || August 16, 2006 || Palomar || NEAT || — || align=right | 1.6 km || 
|-id=473 bgcolor=#E9E9E9
| 175473 ||  || — || August 18, 2006 || Kitt Peak || Spacewatch || — || align=right | 1.2 km || 
|-id=474 bgcolor=#E9E9E9
| 175474 ||  || — || August 18, 2006 || Kitt Peak || Spacewatch || MRX || align=right | 1.6 km || 
|-id=475 bgcolor=#d6d6d6
| 175475 ||  || — || August 29, 2006 || Catalina || CSS || — || align=right | 4.5 km || 
|-id=476 bgcolor=#E9E9E9
| 175476 Macheret ||  ||  || September 4, 2006 || Marly || P. Kocher || — || align=right | 1.7 km || 
|-id=477 bgcolor=#E9E9E9
| 175477 ||  || — || September 14, 2006 || Catalina || CSS || — || align=right | 3.1 km || 
|-id=478 bgcolor=#E9E9E9
| 175478 ||  || — || September 12, 2006 || Socorro || LINEAR || — || align=right | 1.3 km || 
|-id=479 bgcolor=#E9E9E9
| 175479 ||  || — || September 14, 2006 || Palomar || NEAT || — || align=right | 1.7 km || 
|-id=480 bgcolor=#d6d6d6
| 175480 ||  || — || September 12, 2006 || Catalina || CSS || — || align=right | 3.7 km || 
|-id=481 bgcolor=#E9E9E9
| 175481 ||  || — || September 14, 2006 || Catalina || CSS || — || align=right | 4.4 km || 
|-id=482 bgcolor=#E9E9E9
| 175482 ||  || — || September 14, 2006 || Kitt Peak || Spacewatch || — || align=right | 2.5 km || 
|-id=483 bgcolor=#d6d6d6
| 175483 ||  || — || September 14, 2006 || Palomar || NEAT || — || align=right | 4.7 km || 
|-id=484 bgcolor=#d6d6d6
| 175484 ||  || — || September 15, 2006 || Socorro || LINEAR || — || align=right | 4.5 km || 
|-id=485 bgcolor=#E9E9E9
| 175485 ||  || — || September 15, 2006 || Socorro || LINEAR || — || align=right | 3.6 km || 
|-id=486 bgcolor=#E9E9E9
| 175486 ||  || — || September 14, 2006 || Palomar || NEAT || GEF || align=right | 3.3 km || 
|-id=487 bgcolor=#d6d6d6
| 175487 ||  || — || September 14, 2006 || Catalina || CSS || — || align=right | 6.2 km || 
|-id=488 bgcolor=#d6d6d6
| 175488 ||  || — || September 14, 2006 || Catalina || CSS || URS || align=right | 5.3 km || 
|-id=489 bgcolor=#fefefe
| 175489 ||  || — || September 12, 2006 || Catalina || CSS || NYS || align=right | 1.2 km || 
|-id=490 bgcolor=#fefefe
| 175490 ||  || — || September 14, 2006 || Kitt Peak || Spacewatch || — || align=right | 1.6 km || 
|-id=491 bgcolor=#fefefe
| 175491 ||  || — || September 14, 2006 || Kitt Peak || Spacewatch || MAS || align=right data-sort-value="0.93" | 930 m || 
|-id=492 bgcolor=#E9E9E9
| 175492 ||  || — || September 14, 2006 || Palomar || NEAT || — || align=right | 4.1 km || 
|-id=493 bgcolor=#d6d6d6
| 175493 ||  || — || September 14, 2006 || Kitt Peak || Spacewatch || — || align=right | 3.2 km || 
|-id=494 bgcolor=#E9E9E9
| 175494 ||  || — || September 14, 2006 || Kitt Peak || Spacewatch || — || align=right | 3.3 km || 
|-id=495 bgcolor=#E9E9E9
| 175495 ||  || — || September 12, 2006 || Catalina || CSS || AGN || align=right | 1.7 km || 
|-id=496 bgcolor=#d6d6d6
| 175496 ||  || — || September 12, 2006 || Catalina || CSS || — || align=right | 4.1 km || 
|-id=497 bgcolor=#d6d6d6
| 175497 ||  || — || September 12, 2006 || Catalina || CSS || KOR || align=right | 2.1 km || 
|-id=498 bgcolor=#E9E9E9
| 175498 ||  || — || September 15, 2006 || Kitt Peak || Spacewatch || — || align=right | 3.0 km || 
|-id=499 bgcolor=#E9E9E9
| 175499 ||  || — || September 15, 2006 || Kitt Peak || Spacewatch || — || align=right | 1.5 km || 
|-id=500 bgcolor=#E9E9E9
| 175500 ||  || — || September 15, 2006 || Kitt Peak || Spacewatch || — || align=right | 1.5 km || 
|}

175501–175600 

|-bgcolor=#E9E9E9
| 175501 ||  || — || September 15, 2006 || Kitt Peak || Spacewatch || — || align=right | 3.2 km || 
|-id=502 bgcolor=#d6d6d6
| 175502 ||  || — || September 15, 2006 || Kitt Peak || Spacewatch || — || align=right | 5.3 km || 
|-id=503 bgcolor=#E9E9E9
| 175503 ||  || — || September 15, 2006 || Kitt Peak || Spacewatch || HEN || align=right | 1.5 km || 
|-id=504 bgcolor=#E9E9E9
| 175504 ||  || — || September 14, 2006 || Palomar || NEAT || — || align=right | 2.1 km || 
|-id=505 bgcolor=#E9E9E9
| 175505 ||  || — || September 15, 2006 || Apache Point || A. C. Becker || — || align=right | 3.1 km || 
|-id=506 bgcolor=#d6d6d6
| 175506 ||  || — || September 16, 2006 || Kitt Peak || Spacewatch || KAR || align=right | 1.6 km || 
|-id=507 bgcolor=#fefefe
| 175507 ||  || — || September 16, 2006 || Anderson Mesa || LONEOS || V || align=right | 1.1 km || 
|-id=508 bgcolor=#fefefe
| 175508 ||  || — || September 16, 2006 || Socorro || LINEAR || NYS || align=right | 1.0 km || 
|-id=509 bgcolor=#fefefe
| 175509 ||  || — || September 17, 2006 || Catalina || CSS || FLO || align=right data-sort-value="0.86" | 860 m || 
|-id=510 bgcolor=#E9E9E9
| 175510 ||  || — || September 17, 2006 || Kitt Peak || Spacewatch || — || align=right | 2.0 km || 
|-id=511 bgcolor=#E9E9E9
| 175511 ||  || — || September 16, 2006 || Palomar || NEAT || — || align=right | 3.8 km || 
|-id=512 bgcolor=#E9E9E9
| 175512 ||  || — || September 17, 2006 || Anderson Mesa || LONEOS || EUN || align=right | 2.2 km || 
|-id=513 bgcolor=#E9E9E9
| 175513 ||  || — || September 16, 2006 || Anderson Mesa || LONEOS || PAD || align=right | 3.7 km || 
|-id=514 bgcolor=#E9E9E9
| 175514 ||  || — || September 17, 2006 || Anderson Mesa || LONEOS || WIT || align=right | 1.9 km || 
|-id=515 bgcolor=#E9E9E9
| 175515 ||  || — || September 18, 2006 || Catalina || CSS || — || align=right | 4.1 km || 
|-id=516 bgcolor=#fefefe
| 175516 ||  || — || September 18, 2006 || Anderson Mesa || LONEOS || V || align=right data-sort-value="0.92" | 920 m || 
|-id=517 bgcolor=#d6d6d6
| 175517 ||  || — || September 19, 2006 || Catalina || CSS || KOR || align=right | 2.0 km || 
|-id=518 bgcolor=#d6d6d6
| 175518 ||  || — || September 17, 2006 || Catalina || CSS || EMA || align=right | 6.6 km || 
|-id=519 bgcolor=#FA8072
| 175519 ||  || — || September 18, 2006 || Catalina || CSS || — || align=right | 1.1 km || 
|-id=520 bgcolor=#d6d6d6
| 175520 ||  || — || September 17, 2006 || Anderson Mesa || LONEOS || TIR || align=right | 5.5 km || 
|-id=521 bgcolor=#d6d6d6
| 175521 ||  || — || September 18, 2006 || Catalina || CSS || — || align=right | 4.2 km || 
|-id=522 bgcolor=#fefefe
| 175522 ||  || — || September 18, 2006 || Catalina || CSS || — || align=right | 1.4 km || 
|-id=523 bgcolor=#fefefe
| 175523 ||  || — || September 19, 2006 || Kitt Peak || Spacewatch || MAS || align=right | 1.1 km || 
|-id=524 bgcolor=#E9E9E9
| 175524 ||  || — || September 19, 2006 || Kitt Peak || Spacewatch || AGN || align=right | 1.6 km || 
|-id=525 bgcolor=#d6d6d6
| 175525 ||  || — || September 19, 2006 || Kitt Peak || Spacewatch || — || align=right | 5.0 km || 
|-id=526 bgcolor=#d6d6d6
| 175526 ||  || — || September 19, 2006 || Kitt Peak || Spacewatch || — || align=right | 2.9 km || 
|-id=527 bgcolor=#d6d6d6
| 175527 ||  || — || September 18, 2006 || Kitt Peak || Spacewatch || — || align=right | 5.3 km || 
|-id=528 bgcolor=#d6d6d6
| 175528 ||  || — || September 18, 2006 || Kitt Peak || Spacewatch || KOR || align=right | 1.6 km || 
|-id=529 bgcolor=#d6d6d6
| 175529 ||  || — || September 24, 2006 || Kitt Peak || Spacewatch || — || align=right | 3.5 km || 
|-id=530 bgcolor=#d6d6d6
| 175530 ||  || — || September 18, 2006 || Catalina || CSS || ALA || align=right | 6.4 km || 
|-id=531 bgcolor=#E9E9E9
| 175531 ||  || — || September 18, 2006 || Catalina || CSS || — || align=right | 1.5 km || 
|-id=532 bgcolor=#E9E9E9
| 175532 ||  || — || September 19, 2006 || Catalina || CSS || EUN || align=right | 1.7 km || 
|-id=533 bgcolor=#E9E9E9
| 175533 ||  || — || September 19, 2006 || Catalina || CSS || — || align=right | 3.3 km || 
|-id=534 bgcolor=#fefefe
| 175534 ||  || — || September 21, 2006 || Anderson Mesa || LONEOS || — || align=right | 4.3 km || 
|-id=535 bgcolor=#fefefe
| 175535 ||  || — || September 19, 2006 || Catalina || CSS || MAS || align=right data-sort-value="0.85" | 850 m || 
|-id=536 bgcolor=#d6d6d6
| 175536 ||  || — || September 25, 2006 || Kitt Peak || Spacewatch || — || align=right | 3.4 km || 
|-id=537 bgcolor=#E9E9E9
| 175537 ||  || — || September 25, 2006 || Mount Lemmon || Mount Lemmon Survey || HEN || align=right | 1.5 km || 
|-id=538 bgcolor=#E9E9E9
| 175538 ||  || — || September 26, 2006 || Catalina || CSS || PAD || align=right | 5.1 km || 
|-id=539 bgcolor=#E9E9E9
| 175539 ||  || — || September 24, 2006 || Kitt Peak || Spacewatch || HOF || align=right | 3.5 km || 
|-id=540 bgcolor=#fefefe
| 175540 ||  || — || September 25, 2006 || Anderson Mesa || LONEOS || — || align=right | 1.3 km || 
|-id=541 bgcolor=#E9E9E9
| 175541 ||  || — || September 26, 2006 || Kitt Peak || Spacewatch || — || align=right | 2.6 km || 
|-id=542 bgcolor=#d6d6d6
| 175542 ||  || — || September 29, 2006 || RAS || A. Lowe || EOS || align=right | 3.0 km || 
|-id=543 bgcolor=#fefefe
| 175543 ||  || — || September 29, 2006 || Kitami || K. Endate || — || align=right | 1.5 km || 
|-id=544 bgcolor=#E9E9E9
| 175544 ||  || — || September 26, 2006 || Kitt Peak || Spacewatch || PAD || align=right | 3.1 km || 
|-id=545 bgcolor=#E9E9E9
| 175545 ||  || — || September 26, 2006 || Mount Lemmon || Mount Lemmon Survey || — || align=right | 1.2 km || 
|-id=546 bgcolor=#d6d6d6
| 175546 ||  || — || September 27, 2006 || Mount Lemmon || Mount Lemmon Survey || — || align=right | 6.3 km || 
|-id=547 bgcolor=#E9E9E9
| 175547 ||  || — || September 29, 2006 || Anderson Mesa || LONEOS || — || align=right | 3.6 km || 
|-id=548 bgcolor=#E9E9E9
| 175548 Sudzius ||  ||  || September 27, 2006 || Molėtai || K. Černis, J. Zdanavičius || — || align=right | 2.2 km || 
|-id=549 bgcolor=#E9E9E9
| 175549 ||  || — || September 25, 2006 || Kitt Peak || Spacewatch || — || align=right | 2.6 km || 
|-id=550 bgcolor=#E9E9E9
| 175550 ||  || — || September 26, 2006 || Catalina || CSS || — || align=right | 2.6 km || 
|-id=551 bgcolor=#E9E9E9
| 175551 ||  || — || September 27, 2006 || Mount Lemmon || Mount Lemmon Survey || — || align=right | 2.0 km || 
|-id=552 bgcolor=#E9E9E9
| 175552 ||  || — || September 27, 2006 || Kitt Peak || Spacewatch || NEM || align=right | 3.6 km || 
|-id=553 bgcolor=#d6d6d6
| 175553 ||  || — || September 27, 2006 || Kitt Peak || Spacewatch || — || align=right | 5.9 km || 
|-id=554 bgcolor=#E9E9E9
| 175554 ||  || — || September 27, 2006 || Kitt Peak || Spacewatch || — || align=right | 1.4 km || 
|-id=555 bgcolor=#d6d6d6
| 175555 ||  || — || September 28, 2006 || Mount Lemmon || Mount Lemmon Survey || EOS || align=right | 2.6 km || 
|-id=556 bgcolor=#d6d6d6
| 175556 ||  || — || September 30, 2006 || Catalina || CSS || EOS || align=right | 3.4 km || 
|-id=557 bgcolor=#d6d6d6
| 175557 ||  || — || September 30, 2006 || Catalina || CSS || — || align=right | 4.9 km || 
|-id=558 bgcolor=#E9E9E9
| 175558 ||  || — || September 30, 2006 || Catalina || CSS || — || align=right | 2.7 km || 
|-id=559 bgcolor=#d6d6d6
| 175559 ||  || — || September 30, 2006 || Catalina || CSS || EOS || align=right | 3.0 km || 
|-id=560 bgcolor=#E9E9E9
| 175560 ||  || — || September 30, 2006 || Catalina || CSS || — || align=right | 2.2 km || 
|-id=561 bgcolor=#d6d6d6
| 175561 ||  || — || September 19, 2006 || Catalina || CSS || BRA || align=right | 2.4 km || 
|-id=562 bgcolor=#d6d6d6
| 175562 Ajsingh ||  ||  || September 28, 2006 || Apache Point || A. C. Becker || — || align=right | 3.8 km || 
|-id=563 bgcolor=#E9E9E9
| 175563 Amyrose ||  ||  || September 30, 2006 || Apache Point || A. C. Becker || — || align=right | 2.5 km || 
|-id=564 bgcolor=#d6d6d6
| 175564 ||  || — || September 28, 2006 || Catalina || CSS || — || align=right | 5.3 km || 
|-id=565 bgcolor=#E9E9E9
| 175565 || 2006 TV || — || October 2, 2006 || Catalina || CSS || BRU || align=right | 6.1 km || 
|-id=566 bgcolor=#d6d6d6
| 175566 Papplaci ||  ||  || October 1, 2006 || Piszkéstető || K. Sárneczky, B. Csák || CHA || align=right | 3.0 km || 
|-id=567 bgcolor=#fefefe
| 175567 ||  || — || October 14, 2006 || Piszkéstető || K. Sárneczky, Z. Kuli || — || align=right | 1.1 km || 
|-id=568 bgcolor=#d6d6d6
| 175568 ||  || — || October 11, 2006 || Kitt Peak || Spacewatch || KOR || align=right | 1.9 km || 
|-id=569 bgcolor=#d6d6d6
| 175569 ||  || — || October 11, 2006 || Kitt Peak || Spacewatch || — || align=right | 3.4 km || 
|-id=570 bgcolor=#d6d6d6
| 175570 ||  || — || October 11, 2006 || Kitt Peak || Spacewatch || KOR || align=right | 1.9 km || 
|-id=571 bgcolor=#d6d6d6
| 175571 ||  || — || October 12, 2006 || Kitt Peak || Spacewatch || — || align=right | 4.5 km || 
|-id=572 bgcolor=#d6d6d6
| 175572 ||  || — || October 12, 2006 || Kitt Peak || Spacewatch || — || align=right | 3.8 km || 
|-id=573 bgcolor=#d6d6d6
| 175573 ||  || — || October 12, 2006 || Palomar || NEAT || HYG || align=right | 4.0 km || 
|-id=574 bgcolor=#d6d6d6
| 175574 ||  || — || October 12, 2006 || Palomar || NEAT || ALA || align=right | 6.5 km || 
|-id=575 bgcolor=#E9E9E9
| 175575 ||  || — || October 9, 2006 || Palomar || NEAT || NEM || align=right | 3.6 km || 
|-id=576 bgcolor=#d6d6d6
| 175576 ||  || — || October 9, 2006 || Palomar || NEAT || EOS || align=right | 2.9 km || 
|-id=577 bgcolor=#d6d6d6
| 175577 ||  || — || October 11, 2006 || Palomar || NEAT || — || align=right | 3.9 km || 
|-id=578 bgcolor=#d6d6d6
| 175578 ||  || — || October 11, 2006 || Palomar || NEAT || EOS || align=right | 3.8 km || 
|-id=579 bgcolor=#E9E9E9
| 175579 ||  || — || October 13, 2006 || Kitt Peak || Spacewatch || — || align=right | 2.5 km || 
|-id=580 bgcolor=#d6d6d6
| 175580 ||  || — || October 13, 2006 || Kitt Peak || Spacewatch || — || align=right | 3.5 km || 
|-id=581 bgcolor=#d6d6d6
| 175581 ||  || — || October 15, 2006 || Kitt Peak || Spacewatch || — || align=right | 3.3 km || 
|-id=582 bgcolor=#fefefe
| 175582 ||  || — || October 15, 2006 || Catalina || CSS || FLO || align=right | 1.1 km || 
|-id=583 bgcolor=#d6d6d6
| 175583 Pingtung ||  ||  || October 15, 2006 || Lulin Observatory || C.-S. Lin, Q.-z. Ye || EOS || align=right | 3.3 km || 
|-id=584 bgcolor=#E9E9E9
| 175584 ||  || — || October 15, 2006 || Kitt Peak || Spacewatch || — || align=right | 2.1 km || 
|-id=585 bgcolor=#E9E9E9
| 175585 ||  || — || October 15, 2006 || Kitt Peak || Spacewatch || — || align=right | 3.9 km || 
|-id=586 bgcolor=#d6d6d6
| 175586 Tsou ||  ||  || October 15, 2006 || Lulin Observatory || Q.-z. Ye, C.-S. Lin || — || align=right | 4.1 km || 
|-id=587 bgcolor=#E9E9E9
| 175587 ||  || — || October 2, 2006 || Mount Lemmon || Mount Lemmon Survey || — || align=right | 1.9 km || 
|-id=588 bgcolor=#E9E9E9
| 175588 Kathrynsmith ||  ||  || October 3, 2006 || Apache Point || A. C. Becker || GEF || align=right | 1.9 km || 
|-id=589 bgcolor=#d6d6d6
| 175589 || 2006 UD || — || October 16, 2006 || Catalina || CSS || KOR || align=right | 2.2 km || 
|-id=590 bgcolor=#fefefe
| 175590 ||  || — || October 16, 2006 || Kitt Peak || Spacewatch || NYS || align=right data-sort-value="0.87" | 870 m || 
|-id=591 bgcolor=#d6d6d6
| 175591 ||  || — || October 16, 2006 || Kitt Peak || Spacewatch || — || align=right | 3.4 km || 
|-id=592 bgcolor=#d6d6d6
| 175592 ||  || — || October 16, 2006 || Kitt Peak || Spacewatch || KOR || align=right | 1.6 km || 
|-id=593 bgcolor=#E9E9E9
| 175593 ||  || — || October 16, 2006 || Kitt Peak || Spacewatch || — || align=right | 2.1 km || 
|-id=594 bgcolor=#E9E9E9
| 175594 ||  || — || October 16, 2006 || Catalina || CSS || — || align=right | 2.5 km || 
|-id=595 bgcolor=#E9E9E9
| 175595 ||  || — || October 16, 2006 || Kitt Peak || Spacewatch || — || align=right | 1.7 km || 
|-id=596 bgcolor=#d6d6d6
| 175596 ||  || — || October 18, 2006 || Kitt Peak || Spacewatch || — || align=right | 2.5 km || 
|-id=597 bgcolor=#d6d6d6
| 175597 ||  || — || October 17, 2006 || Mount Lemmon || Mount Lemmon Survey || — || align=right | 3.9 km || 
|-id=598 bgcolor=#d6d6d6
| 175598 ||  || — || October 17, 2006 || Mount Lemmon || Mount Lemmon Survey || KOR || align=right | 1.9 km || 
|-id=599 bgcolor=#d6d6d6
| 175599 ||  || — || October 18, 2006 || Kitt Peak || Spacewatch || — || align=right | 5.2 km || 
|-id=600 bgcolor=#d6d6d6
| 175600 ||  || — || October 16, 2006 || Catalina || CSS || CHA || align=right | 2.9 km || 
|}

175601–175700 

|-bgcolor=#E9E9E9
| 175601 ||  || — || October 16, 2006 || Catalina || CSS || — || align=right | 3.8 km || 
|-id=602 bgcolor=#E9E9E9
| 175602 ||  || — || October 19, 2006 || Catalina || CSS || — || align=right | 3.4 km || 
|-id=603 bgcolor=#d6d6d6
| 175603 ||  || — || October 19, 2006 || Catalina || CSS || EOS || align=right | 5.4 km || 
|-id=604 bgcolor=#d6d6d6
| 175604 ||  || — || October 20, 2006 || Palomar || NEAT || — || align=right | 4.0 km || 
|-id=605 bgcolor=#d6d6d6
| 175605 ||  || — || October 21, 2006 || Catalina || CSS || KOR || align=right | 2.2 km || 
|-id=606 bgcolor=#fefefe
| 175606 ||  || — || October 21, 2006 || Catalina || CSS || NYS || align=right | 1.0 km || 
|-id=607 bgcolor=#E9E9E9
| 175607 ||  || — || October 28, 2006 || Kitt Peak || Spacewatch || — || align=right | 1.7 km || 
|-id=608 bgcolor=#d6d6d6
| 175608 ||  || — || November 9, 2006 || Kitt Peak || Spacewatch || — || align=right | 3.3 km || 
|-id=609 bgcolor=#d6d6d6
| 175609 ||  || — || November 11, 2006 || Mount Lemmon || Mount Lemmon Survey || THM || align=right | 3.3 km || 
|-id=610 bgcolor=#d6d6d6
| 175610 ||  || — || November 9, 2006 || Kitt Peak || Spacewatch || — || align=right | 4.1 km || 
|-id=611 bgcolor=#d6d6d6
| 175611 ||  || — || November 10, 2006 || Kitt Peak || Spacewatch || HYG || align=right | 4.3 km || 
|-id=612 bgcolor=#d6d6d6
| 175612 ||  || — || November 13, 2006 || Kitt Peak || Spacewatch || KOR || align=right | 2.2 km || 
|-id=613 bgcolor=#d6d6d6
| 175613 Shikoku-karst ||  ||  || November 12, 2006 || Kuma Kogen || Y. Fujita || — || align=right | 4.5 km || 
|-id=614 bgcolor=#d6d6d6
| 175614 ||  || — || November 15, 2006 || Catalina || CSS || EOS || align=right | 3.0 km || 
|-id=615 bgcolor=#E9E9E9
| 175615 ||  || — || November 8, 2006 || Palomar || NEAT || — || align=right | 3.3 km || 
|-id=616 bgcolor=#d6d6d6
| 175616 ||  || — || November 16, 2006 || Kitt Peak || Spacewatch || — || align=right | 3.2 km || 
|-id=617 bgcolor=#d6d6d6
| 175617 ||  || — || November 16, 2006 || Kitt Peak || Spacewatch || HYG || align=right | 3.4 km || 
|-id=618 bgcolor=#d6d6d6
| 175618 ||  || — || November 16, 2006 || Kitt Peak || Spacewatch || — || align=right | 3.4 km || 
|-id=619 bgcolor=#E9E9E9
| 175619 ||  || — || November 16, 2006 || Catalina || CSS || — || align=right | 1.9 km || 
|-id=620 bgcolor=#d6d6d6
| 175620 ||  || — || November 19, 2006 || Kitt Peak || Spacewatch || 3:2 || align=right | 8.0 km || 
|-id=621 bgcolor=#d6d6d6
| 175621 ||  || — || November 22, 2006 || Mount Lemmon || Mount Lemmon Survey || — || align=right | 6.3 km || 
|-id=622 bgcolor=#FA8072
| 175622 ||  || — || December 15, 2006 || Siding Spring || SSS || — || align=right | 2.3 km || 
|-id=623 bgcolor=#d6d6d6
| 175623 ||  || — || December 22, 2006 || Črni Vrh || Črni Vrh || BRA || align=right | 2.5 km || 
|-id=624 bgcolor=#d6d6d6
| 175624 ||  || — || December 23, 2006 || Mount Lemmon || Mount Lemmon Survey || — || align=right | 3.6 km || 
|-id=625 bgcolor=#E9E9E9
| 175625 Canaryastroinst ||  ||  || July 23, 2007 || OAM || OAM Obs. || — || align=right | 6.2 km || 
|-id=626 bgcolor=#d6d6d6
| 175626 ||  || — || August 11, 2007 || Socorro || LINEAR || — || align=right | 5.5 km || 
|-id=627 bgcolor=#E9E9E9
| 175627 ||  || — || September 10, 2007 || Catalina || CSS || MAR || align=right | 1.7 km || 
|-id=628 bgcolor=#E9E9E9
| 175628 ||  || — || September 10, 2007 || Catalina || CSS || — || align=right | 3.7 km || 
|-id=629 bgcolor=#E9E9E9
| 175629 Lambertini ||  ||  || September 19, 2007 || Skylive Obs. || F. Tozzi, M. Graziani || CLO || align=right | 3.2 km || 
|-id=630 bgcolor=#E9E9E9
| 175630 ||  || — || October 6, 2007 || Kitt Peak || Spacewatch || — || align=right | 3.4 km || 
|-id=631 bgcolor=#d6d6d6
| 175631 ||  || — || October 4, 2007 || Kitt Peak || Spacewatch || — || align=right | 4.0 km || 
|-id=632 bgcolor=#E9E9E9
| 175632 ||  || — || October 8, 2007 || Mount Lemmon || Mount Lemmon Survey || — || align=right | 2.4 km || 
|-id=633 bgcolor=#d6d6d6
| 175633 Yaoan ||  ||  || October 9, 2007 || Purple Mountain || PMO NEO || — || align=right | 5.1 km || 
|-id=634 bgcolor=#d6d6d6
| 175634 ||  || — || October 7, 2007 || Kitt Peak || Spacewatch || — || align=right | 4.3 km || 
|-id=635 bgcolor=#d6d6d6
| 175635 ||  || — || October 12, 2007 || Anderson Mesa || LONEOS || — || align=right | 4.1 km || 
|-id=636 bgcolor=#d6d6d6
| 175636 Zvyagel ||  ||  || October 17, 2007 || Andrushivka || Andrushivka Obs. || — || align=right | 5.9 km || 
|-id=637 bgcolor=#fefefe
| 175637 ||  || — || October 16, 2007 || Kitt Peak || Spacewatch || — || align=right data-sort-value="0.94" | 940 m || 
|-id=638 bgcolor=#E9E9E9
| 175638 ||  || — || October 21, 2007 || Kitt Peak || Spacewatch || — || align=right | 3.5 km || 
|-id=639 bgcolor=#fefefe
| 175639 ||  || — || October 24, 2007 || Mount Lemmon || Mount Lemmon Survey || — || align=right | 1.1 km || 
|-id=640 bgcolor=#fefefe
| 175640 ||  || — || October 30, 2007 || Kitt Peak || Spacewatch || NYS || align=right | 2.3 km || 
|-id=641 bgcolor=#E9E9E9
| 175641 ||  || — || November 2, 2007 || Kitt Peak || Spacewatch || — || align=right | 3.4 km || 
|-id=642 bgcolor=#fefefe
| 175642 ||  || — || November 3, 2007 || Kitt Peak || Spacewatch || NYS || align=right data-sort-value="0.81" | 810 m || 
|-id=643 bgcolor=#fefefe
| 175643 ||  || — || November 5, 2007 || Kitt Peak || Spacewatch || NYS || align=right data-sort-value="0.79" | 790 m || 
|-id=644 bgcolor=#E9E9E9
| 175644 ||  || — || November 5, 2007 || Kitt Peak || Spacewatch || — || align=right | 2.1 km || 
|-id=645 bgcolor=#fefefe
| 175645 ||  || — || November 13, 2007 || Kitt Peak || Spacewatch || — || align=right | 1.4 km || 
|-id=646 bgcolor=#E9E9E9
| 175646 ||  || — || November 14, 2007 || Kitt Peak || Spacewatch || — || align=right | 3.1 km || 
|-id=647 bgcolor=#E9E9E9
| 175647 || 4091 P-L || — || September 24, 1960 || Palomar || PLS || — || align=right | 2.0 km || 
|-id=648 bgcolor=#E9E9E9
| 175648 || 4326 P-L || — || September 24, 1960 || Palomar || PLS || — || align=right | 1.5 km || 
|-id=649 bgcolor=#fefefe
| 175649 || 6233 P-L || — || September 24, 1960 || Palomar || PLS || FLO || align=right | 1.3 km || 
|-id=650 bgcolor=#fefefe
| 175650 || 1408 T-2 || — || September 29, 1973 || Palomar || PLS || — || align=right | 1.1 km || 
|-id=651 bgcolor=#E9E9E9
| 175651 || 3094 T-2 || — || September 30, 1973 || Palomar || PLS || — || align=right | 2.1 km || 
|-id=652 bgcolor=#fefefe
| 175652 || 3257 T-2 || — || September 30, 1973 || Palomar || PLS || NYS || align=right data-sort-value="0.85" | 850 m || 
|-id=653 bgcolor=#E9E9E9
| 175653 || 1014 T-3 || — || October 17, 1977 || Palomar || PLS || ADE || align=right | 3.6 km || 
|-id=654 bgcolor=#fefefe
| 175654 || 2130 T-3 || — || October 16, 1977 || Palomar || PLS || FLO || align=right | 1.3 km || 
|-id=655 bgcolor=#fefefe
| 175655 || 3306 T-3 || — || October 16, 1977 || Palomar || PLS || — || align=right data-sort-value="0.77" | 770 m || 
|-id=656 bgcolor=#fefefe
| 175656 || 3397 T-3 || — || October 16, 1977 || Palomar || PLS || — || align=right | 1.4 km || 
|-id=657 bgcolor=#fefefe
| 175657 || 3426 T-3 || — || October 16, 1977 || Palomar || PLS || NYS || align=right data-sort-value="0.71" | 710 m || 
|-id=658 bgcolor=#E9E9E9
| 175658 || 3578 T-3 || — || October 11, 1977 || Palomar || PLS || — || align=right | 1.5 km || 
|-id=659 bgcolor=#d6d6d6
| 175659 ||  || — || March 3, 1981 || Siding Spring || S. J. Bus || — || align=right | 5.1 km || 
|-id=660 bgcolor=#E9E9E9
| 175660 ||  || — || August 24, 1981 || La Silla || H. Debehogne || — || align=right | 3.0 km || 
|-id=661 bgcolor=#E9E9E9
| 175661 ||  || — || September 26, 1989 || Calar Alto || J. M. Baur, K. Birkle || ADE || align=right | 2.9 km || 
|-id=662 bgcolor=#fefefe
| 175662 ||  || — || January 22, 1993 || Kitt Peak || Spacewatch || MAS || align=right | 1.0 km || 
|-id=663 bgcolor=#fefefe
| 175663 ||  || — || March 19, 1993 || La Silla || UESAC || NYS || align=right | 1.2 km || 
|-id=664 bgcolor=#d6d6d6
| 175664 ||  || — || May 24, 1993 || Kitt Peak || Spacewatch || — || align=right | 5.0 km || 
|-id=665 bgcolor=#fefefe
| 175665 || 1993 MJ || — || June 16, 1993 || Kitt Peak || Spacewatch || — || align=right data-sort-value="0.91" | 910 m || 
|-id=666 bgcolor=#E9E9E9
| 175666 ||  || — || October 12, 1993 || Kitt Peak || Spacewatch || — || align=right | 2.5 km || 
|-id=667 bgcolor=#E9E9E9
| 175667 ||  || — || October 9, 1993 || La Silla || E. W. Elst || — || align=right | 3.4 km || 
|-id=668 bgcolor=#d6d6d6
| 175668 ||  || — || January 8, 1994 || Kitt Peak || Spacewatch || KOR || align=right | 2.2 km || 
|-id=669 bgcolor=#fefefe
| 175669 ||  || — || June 3, 1994 || La Silla || H. Debehogne || — || align=right | 1.4 km || 
|-id=670 bgcolor=#d6d6d6
| 175670 ||  || — || August 12, 1994 || La Silla || E. W. Elst || — || align=right | 5.3 km || 
|-id=671 bgcolor=#d6d6d6
| 175671 ||  || — || September 28, 1994 || Kitt Peak || Spacewatch || — || align=right | 3.3 km || 
|-id=672 bgcolor=#d6d6d6
| 175672 ||  || — || October 28, 1994 || Kitt Peak || Spacewatch || — || align=right | 3.5 km || 
|-id=673 bgcolor=#d6d6d6
| 175673 ||  || — || October 29, 1994 || Kitt Peak || Spacewatch || — || align=right | 4.5 km || 
|-id=674 bgcolor=#E9E9E9
| 175674 ||  || — || November 28, 1994 || Kitt Peak || Spacewatch || — || align=right | 2.0 km || 
|-id=675 bgcolor=#E9E9E9
| 175675 ||  || — || February 1, 1995 || Kitt Peak || Spacewatch || — || align=right | 2.9 km || 
|-id=676 bgcolor=#E9E9E9
| 175676 ||  || — || February 24, 1995 || Kitt Peak || Spacewatch || NEM || align=right | 2.6 km || 
|-id=677 bgcolor=#E9E9E9
| 175677 ||  || — || March 2, 1995 || Kitt Peak || Spacewatch || — || align=right | 2.6 km || 
|-id=678 bgcolor=#E9E9E9
| 175678 ||  || — || March 23, 1995 || Kitt Peak || Spacewatch || PAD || align=right | 3.1 km || 
|-id=679 bgcolor=#E9E9E9
| 175679 ||  || — || April 1, 1995 || Kitt Peak || Spacewatch || — || align=right | 3.0 km || 
|-id=680 bgcolor=#E9E9E9
| 175680 ||  || — || April 1, 1995 || Kitt Peak || Spacewatch || — || align=right | 3.9 km || 
|-id=681 bgcolor=#E9E9E9
| 175681 ||  || — || April 2, 1995 || Kitt Peak || Spacewatch || — || align=right | 2.6 km || 
|-id=682 bgcolor=#fefefe
| 175682 ||  || — || June 22, 1995 || Kitt Peak || Spacewatch || — || align=right | 1.1 km || 
|-id=683 bgcolor=#fefefe
| 175683 ||  || — || July 22, 1995 || Kitt Peak || Spacewatch || MAS || align=right | 1.0 km || 
|-id=684 bgcolor=#fefefe
| 175684 ||  || — || August 27, 1995 || Kitt Peak || Spacewatch || — || align=right | 1.4 km || 
|-id=685 bgcolor=#fefefe
| 175685 ||  || — || September 17, 1995 || Kitt Peak || Spacewatch || — || align=right | 1.2 km || 
|-id=686 bgcolor=#fefefe
| 175686 ||  || — || September 17, 1995 || Kitt Peak || Spacewatch || V || align=right data-sort-value="0.76" | 760 m || 
|-id=687 bgcolor=#d6d6d6
| 175687 ||  || — || September 18, 1995 || Kitt Peak || Spacewatch || — || align=right | 3.2 km || 
|-id=688 bgcolor=#d6d6d6
| 175688 ||  || — || September 18, 1995 || Kitt Peak || Spacewatch || — || align=right | 3.0 km || 
|-id=689 bgcolor=#d6d6d6
| 175689 ||  || — || September 18, 1995 || Kitt Peak || Spacewatch || TIR || align=right | 3.2 km || 
|-id=690 bgcolor=#d6d6d6
| 175690 ||  || — || September 22, 1995 || Kitt Peak || Spacewatch || KOR || align=right | 2.1 km || 
|-id=691 bgcolor=#fefefe
| 175691 ||  || — || September 24, 1995 || Kitt Peak || Spacewatch || V || align=right data-sort-value="0.88" | 880 m || 
|-id=692 bgcolor=#fefefe
| 175692 ||  || — || September 25, 1995 || Kitt Peak || Spacewatch || MAS || align=right data-sort-value="0.92" | 920 m || 
|-id=693 bgcolor=#d6d6d6
| 175693 ||  || — || September 25, 1995 || Kitt Peak || Spacewatch || — || align=right | 2.9 km || 
|-id=694 bgcolor=#d6d6d6
| 175694 ||  || — || September 26, 1995 || Kitt Peak || Spacewatch || — || align=right | 3.0 km || 
|-id=695 bgcolor=#fefefe
| 175695 ||  || — || October 15, 1995 || Kitt Peak || Spacewatch || NYS || align=right | 1.1 km || 
|-id=696 bgcolor=#fefefe
| 175696 ||  || — || October 1, 1995 || Kitt Peak || Spacewatch || NYS || align=right data-sort-value="0.77" | 770 m || 
|-id=697 bgcolor=#fefefe
| 175697 ||  || — || October 23, 1995 || Kleť || Kleť Obs. || MAS || align=right | 1.2 km || 
|-id=698 bgcolor=#d6d6d6
| 175698 ||  || — || October 20, 1995 || Haleakala || AMOS || — || align=right | 5.0 km || 
|-id=699 bgcolor=#fefefe
| 175699 ||  || — || October 17, 1995 || Kitt Peak || Spacewatch || MAS || align=right | 1.1 km || 
|-id=700 bgcolor=#d6d6d6
| 175700 ||  || — || October 18, 1995 || Kitt Peak || Spacewatch || EOS || align=right | 2.9 km || 
|}

175701–175800 

|-bgcolor=#d6d6d6
| 175701 ||  || — || October 23, 1995 || Kitt Peak || Spacewatch || — || align=right | 4.8 km || 
|-id=702 bgcolor=#fefefe
| 175702 ||  || — || October 17, 1995 || Kitt Peak || Spacewatch || MAS || align=right data-sort-value="0.97" | 970 m || 
|-id=703 bgcolor=#fefefe
| 175703 ||  || — || October 19, 1995 || Kitt Peak || Spacewatch || — || align=right | 1.1 km || 
|-id=704 bgcolor=#fefefe
| 175704 ||  || — || November 14, 1995 || Kitt Peak || Spacewatch || MAS || align=right | 1.2 km || 
|-id=705 bgcolor=#d6d6d6
| 175705 ||  || — || November 24, 1995 || Kitt Peak || Spacewatch || — || align=right | 3.4 km || 
|-id=706 bgcolor=#FFC2E0
| 175706 ||  || — || March 24, 1996 || Siding Spring || R. H. McNaught || APOPHAmoon || align=right | 1.2 km || 
|-id=707 bgcolor=#E9E9E9
| 175707 ||  || — || August 20, 1996 || Kleť || Kleť Obs. || DOR || align=right | 3.9 km || 
|-id=708 bgcolor=#fefefe
| 175708 ||  || — || September 9, 1996 || Prescott || P. G. Comba || FLO || align=right data-sort-value="0.78" | 780 m || 
|-id=709 bgcolor=#d6d6d6
| 175709 ||  || — || September 5, 1996 || Kitt Peak || Spacewatch || — || align=right | 2.6 km || 
|-id=710 bgcolor=#E9E9E9
| 175710 ||  || — || September 23, 1996 || Nanyo || T. Okuni || — || align=right | 7.6 km || 
|-id=711 bgcolor=#E9E9E9
| 175711 ||  || — || October 4, 1996 || Kitt Peak || Spacewatch || — || align=right | 3.9 km || 
|-id=712 bgcolor=#fefefe
| 175712 ||  || — || October 5, 1996 || Xinglong || SCAP || — || align=right data-sort-value="0.93" | 930 m || 
|-id=713 bgcolor=#d6d6d6
| 175713 ||  || — || November 4, 1996 || Kitt Peak || Spacewatch || — || align=right | 4.3 km || 
|-id=714 bgcolor=#fefefe
| 175714 ||  || — || November 9, 1996 || Kitt Peak || Spacewatch || FLO || align=right | 1.1 km || 
|-id=715 bgcolor=#fefefe
| 175715 ||  || — || December 1, 1996 || Kitt Peak || Spacewatch || FLO || align=right data-sort-value="0.94" | 940 m || 
|-id=716 bgcolor=#d6d6d6
| 175716 ||  || — || December 9, 1996 || Kitt Peak || Spacewatch || SAN || align=right | 2.0 km || 
|-id=717 bgcolor=#FA8072
| 175717 ||  || — || February 6, 1997 || Kitt Peak || Spacewatch || — || align=right data-sort-value="0.64" | 640 m || 
|-id=718 bgcolor=#fefefe
| 175718 Wuzhengyi ||  ||  || February 2, 1997 || Xinglong || SCAP || NYS || align=right | 1.0 km || 
|-id=719 bgcolor=#d6d6d6
| 175719 ||  || — || March 2, 1997 || Kitt Peak || Spacewatch || — || align=right | 4.7 km || 
|-id=720 bgcolor=#d6d6d6
| 175720 ||  || — || March 2, 1997 || Kitt Peak || Spacewatch || — || align=right | 3.6 km || 
|-id=721 bgcolor=#fefefe
| 175721 || 1997 GU || — || April 6, 1997 || Haleakala || NEAT || — || align=right | 1.3 km || 
|-id=722 bgcolor=#d6d6d6
| 175722 ||  || — || April 5, 1997 || Mauna Kea || C. Veillet || — || align=right | 5.6 km || 
|-id=723 bgcolor=#fefefe
| 175723 ||  || — || April 3, 1997 || Socorro || LINEAR || ERI || align=right | 2.0 km || 
|-id=724 bgcolor=#fefefe
| 175724 ||  || — || April 8, 1997 || Kitt Peak || Spacewatch || — || align=right | 1.2 km || 
|-id=725 bgcolor=#E9E9E9
| 175725 ||  || — || July 7, 1997 || Kitt Peak || Spacewatch || — || align=right | 2.4 km || 
|-id=726 bgcolor=#E9E9E9
| 175726 Borda ||  ||  || August 29, 1997 || Dax || P. Dupouy, F. Maréchal || — || align=right | 1.7 km || 
|-id=727 bgcolor=#E9E9E9
| 175727 ||  || — || September 28, 1997 || Kitt Peak || Spacewatch || EUN || align=right | 1.5 km || 
|-id=728 bgcolor=#fefefe
| 175728 ||  || — || January 22, 1998 || Kitt Peak || Spacewatch || — || align=right data-sort-value="0.90" | 900 m || 
|-id=729 bgcolor=#FFC2E0
| 175729 ||  || — || January 25, 1998 || Haleakala || NEAT || APOPHA || align=right data-sort-value="0.29" | 290 m || 
|-id=730 bgcolor=#fefefe
| 175730 Gramastetten ||  ||  || February 18, 1998 || Linz || Davidschlag Obs. || — || align=right | 1.1 km || 
|-id=731 bgcolor=#fefefe
| 175731 ||  || — || February 28, 1998 || La Silla || C.-I. Lagerkvist || — || align=right | 1.1 km || 
|-id=732 bgcolor=#fefefe
| 175732 ||  || — || March 6, 1998 || Teide || Teide Obs. || FLO || align=right data-sort-value="0.91" | 910 m || 
|-id=733 bgcolor=#fefefe
| 175733 ||  || — || March 24, 1998 || Socorro || LINEAR || FLO || align=right | 1.3 km || 
|-id=734 bgcolor=#d6d6d6
| 175734 ||  || — || March 20, 1998 || Socorro || LINEAR || — || align=right | 3.2 km || 
|-id=735 bgcolor=#fefefe
| 175735 ||  || — || April 17, 1998 || Kitt Peak || Spacewatch || — || align=right | 1.1 km || 
|-id=736 bgcolor=#fefefe
| 175736 ||  || — || April 21, 1998 || Caussols || ODAS || FLO || align=right data-sort-value="0.93" | 930 m || 
|-id=737 bgcolor=#d6d6d6
| 175737 ||  || — || April 20, 1998 || Kitt Peak || Spacewatch || URS || align=right | 6.1 km || 
|-id=738 bgcolor=#d6d6d6
| 175738 ||  || — || April 21, 1998 || Socorro || LINEAR || — || align=right | 3.0 km || 
|-id=739 bgcolor=#fefefe
| 175739 ||  || — || May 5, 1998 || Woomera || F. B. Zoltowski || — || align=right | 1.3 km || 
|-id=740 bgcolor=#d6d6d6
| 175740 ||  || — || May 22, 1998 || Kitt Peak || Spacewatch || EOS || align=right | 2.6 km || 
|-id=741 bgcolor=#fefefe
| 175741 ||  || — || June 26, 1998 || Woomera || F. B. Zoltowski || V || align=right | 1.2 km || 
|-id=742 bgcolor=#fefefe
| 175742 ||  || — || June 28, 1998 || La Silla || E. W. Elst || — || align=right | 1.4 km || 
|-id=743 bgcolor=#fefefe
| 175743 ||  || — || July 24, 1998 || Prescott || P. G. Comba || — || align=right | 1.4 km || 
|-id=744 bgcolor=#E9E9E9
| 175744 ||  || — || August 17, 1998 || Socorro || LINEAR || — || align=right | 1.7 km || 
|-id=745 bgcolor=#fefefe
| 175745 ||  || — || August 17, 1998 || Socorro || LINEAR || V || align=right | 1.7 km || 
|-id=746 bgcolor=#E9E9E9
| 175746 ||  || — || August 23, 1998 || Anderson Mesa || LONEOS || — || align=right | 1.4 km || 
|-id=747 bgcolor=#E9E9E9
| 175747 ||  || — || August 24, 1998 || Socorro || LINEAR || — || align=right | 4.1 km || 
|-id=748 bgcolor=#E9E9E9
| 175748 ||  || — || August 24, 1998 || Socorro || LINEAR || — || align=right | 2.0 km || 
|-id=749 bgcolor=#E9E9E9
| 175749 ||  || — || August 24, 1998 || Socorro || LINEAR || JUN || align=right | 1.7 km || 
|-id=750 bgcolor=#fefefe
| 175750 ||  || — || September 15, 1998 || Kitt Peak || Spacewatch || MAS || align=right | 1.1 km || 
|-id=751 bgcolor=#E9E9E9
| 175751 ||  || — || September 14, 1998 || Socorro || LINEAR || — || align=right | 3.4 km || 
|-id=752 bgcolor=#fefefe
| 175752 ||  || — || September 14, 1998 || Socorro || LINEAR || — || align=right | 1.8 km || 
|-id=753 bgcolor=#fefefe
| 175753 ||  || — || September 14, 1998 || Socorro || LINEAR || — || align=right | 2.2 km || 
|-id=754 bgcolor=#E9E9E9
| 175754 ||  || — || September 14, 1998 || Socorro || LINEAR || — || align=right | 1.1 km || 
|-id=755 bgcolor=#fefefe
| 175755 ||  || — || September 14, 1998 || Socorro || LINEAR || ERI || align=right | 2.7 km || 
|-id=756 bgcolor=#fefefe
| 175756 ||  || — || September 14, 1998 || Socorro || LINEAR || — || align=right | 1.2 km || 
|-id=757 bgcolor=#E9E9E9
| 175757 ||  || — || September 16, 1998 || Caussols || ODAS || — || align=right | 2.7 km || 
|-id=758 bgcolor=#fefefe
| 175758 ||  || — || September 21, 1998 || Kitt Peak || Spacewatch || NYS || align=right | 1.1 km || 
|-id=759 bgcolor=#fefefe
| 175759 ||  || — || September 23, 1998 || Kitt Peak || Spacewatch || NYS || align=right data-sort-value="0.85" | 850 m || 
|-id=760 bgcolor=#fefefe
| 175760 ||  || — || September 23, 1998 || Kitt Peak || Spacewatch || — || align=right | 1.3 km || 
|-id=761 bgcolor=#E9E9E9
| 175761 ||  || — || September 27, 1998 || Kitt Peak || Spacewatch || — || align=right | 1.0 km || 
|-id=762 bgcolor=#E9E9E9
| 175762 ||  || — || September 26, 1998 || Socorro || LINEAR || — || align=right | 1.9 km || 
|-id=763 bgcolor=#E9E9E9
| 175763 ||  || — || October 12, 1998 || Kitt Peak || Spacewatch || — || align=right | 1.0 km || 
|-id=764 bgcolor=#FA8072
| 175764 ||  || — || October 20, 1998 || Caussols || ODAS || — || align=right | 1.5 km || 
|-id=765 bgcolor=#E9E9E9
| 175765 ||  || — || October 28, 1998 || Socorro || LINEAR || — || align=right | 2.1 km || 
|-id=766 bgcolor=#E9E9E9
| 175766 ||  || — || November 10, 1998 || Socorro || LINEAR || — || align=right | 2.3 km || 
|-id=767 bgcolor=#E9E9E9
| 175767 ||  || — || November 10, 1998 || Socorro || LINEAR || — || align=right | 2.5 km || 
|-id=768 bgcolor=#E9E9E9
| 175768 ||  || — || November 11, 1998 || Chichibu || N. Satō || — || align=right | 2.1 km || 
|-id=769 bgcolor=#E9E9E9
| 175769 ||  || — || November 15, 1998 || Višnjan Observatory || Višnjan Obs. || — || align=right | 2.1 km || 
|-id=770 bgcolor=#E9E9E9
| 175770 ||  || — || November 21, 1998 || Kitt Peak || Spacewatch || — || align=right | 1.5 km || 
|-id=771 bgcolor=#E9E9E9
| 175771 ||  || — || December 7, 1998 || San Marcello || L. Tesi, A. Boattini || — || align=right | 2.4 km || 
|-id=772 bgcolor=#E9E9E9
| 175772 ||  || — || December 13, 1998 || Prescott || P. G. Comba || — || align=right | 2.4 km || 
|-id=773 bgcolor=#E9E9E9
| 175773 ||  || — || December 8, 1998 || Kitt Peak || Spacewatch || WIT || align=right | 1.5 km || 
|-id=774 bgcolor=#E9E9E9
| 175774 ||  || — || January 14, 1999 || Xinglong || SCAP || — || align=right | 3.4 km || 
|-id=775 bgcolor=#E9E9E9
| 175775 ||  || — || January 19, 1999 || Caussols || ODAS || — || align=right | 2.6 km || 
|-id=776 bgcolor=#E9E9E9
| 175776 ||  || — || February 10, 1999 || Socorro || LINEAR || — || align=right | 2.7 km || 
|-id=777 bgcolor=#E9E9E9
| 175777 ||  || — || February 10, 1999 || Socorro || LINEAR || — || align=right | 2.6 km || 
|-id=778 bgcolor=#E9E9E9
| 175778 ||  || — || February 10, 1999 || Socorro || LINEAR || — || align=right | 3.7 km || 
|-id=779 bgcolor=#E9E9E9
| 175779 ||  || — || February 9, 1999 || Kitt Peak || Spacewatch || — || align=right | 1.7 km || 
|-id=780 bgcolor=#E9E9E9
| 175780 ||  || — || February 10, 1999 || Kitt Peak || Spacewatch || — || align=right | 1.8 km || 
|-id=781 bgcolor=#E9E9E9
| 175781 ||  || — || March 16, 1999 || Kitt Peak || Spacewatch || MRX || align=right | 1.4 km || 
|-id=782 bgcolor=#E9E9E9
| 175782 ||  || — || March 22, 1999 || Anderson Mesa || LONEOS || — || align=right | 4.0 km || 
|-id=783 bgcolor=#fefefe
| 175783 ||  || — || April 19, 1999 || Kitt Peak || Spacewatch || — || align=right data-sort-value="0.80" | 800 m || 
|-id=784 bgcolor=#E9E9E9
| 175784 ||  || — || May 12, 1999 || Socorro || LINEAR || — || align=right | 4.4 km || 
|-id=785 bgcolor=#fefefe
| 175785 ||  || — || July 14, 1999 || Socorro || LINEAR || — || align=right | 1.3 km || 
|-id=786 bgcolor=#FA8072
| 175786 ||  || — || August 12, 1999 || Socorro || LINEAR || — || align=right | 1.5 km || 
|-id=787 bgcolor=#fefefe
| 175787 || 1999 QL || — || August 17, 1999 || Bergisch Gladbach || W. Bickel || V || align=right data-sort-value="0.91" | 910 m || 
|-id=788 bgcolor=#FA8072
| 175788 ||  || — || September 13, 1999 || Socorro || LINEAR || H || align=right | 1.2 km || 
|-id=789 bgcolor=#fefefe
| 175789 ||  || — || September 7, 1999 || Socorro || LINEAR || NYS || align=right data-sort-value="0.97" | 970 m || 
|-id=790 bgcolor=#fefefe
| 175790 ||  || — || September 7, 1999 || Socorro || LINEAR || — || align=right | 1.5 km || 
|-id=791 bgcolor=#fefefe
| 175791 ||  || — || September 7, 1999 || Socorro || LINEAR || — || align=right | 2.1 km || 
|-id=792 bgcolor=#fefefe
| 175792 ||  || — || September 7, 1999 || Socorro || LINEAR || — || align=right | 1.1 km || 
|-id=793 bgcolor=#fefefe
| 175793 ||  || — || September 7, 1999 || Socorro || LINEAR || — || align=right | 1.4 km || 
|-id=794 bgcolor=#d6d6d6
| 175794 ||  || — || September 8, 1999 || Socorro || LINEAR || — || align=right | 7.4 km || 
|-id=795 bgcolor=#fefefe
| 175795 ||  || — || September 9, 1999 || Socorro || LINEAR || — || align=right | 1.4 km || 
|-id=796 bgcolor=#fefefe
| 175796 ||  || — || September 9, 1999 || Socorro || LINEAR || — || align=right | 1.5 km || 
|-id=797 bgcolor=#fefefe
| 175797 ||  || — || September 9, 1999 || Socorro || LINEAR || — || align=right | 1.5 km || 
|-id=798 bgcolor=#fefefe
| 175798 ||  || — || September 9, 1999 || Socorro || LINEAR || ERI || align=right | 2.4 km || 
|-id=799 bgcolor=#fefefe
| 175799 ||  || — || September 9, 1999 || Socorro || LINEAR || ERI || align=right | 3.0 km || 
|-id=800 bgcolor=#fefefe
| 175800 ||  || — || September 9, 1999 || Socorro || LINEAR || — || align=right | 1.4 km || 
|}

175801–175900 

|-bgcolor=#fefefe
| 175801 ||  || — || September 9, 1999 || Socorro || LINEAR || FLO || align=right | 1.0 km || 
|-id=802 bgcolor=#d6d6d6
| 175802 ||  || — || September 9, 1999 || Socorro || LINEAR || AEG || align=right | 5.8 km || 
|-id=803 bgcolor=#d6d6d6
| 175803 ||  || — || September 9, 1999 || Socorro || LINEAR || — || align=right | 5.5 km || 
|-id=804 bgcolor=#fefefe
| 175804 ||  || — || September 9, 1999 || Socorro || LINEAR || V || align=right | 1.1 km || 
|-id=805 bgcolor=#fefefe
| 175805 ||  || — || September 9, 1999 || Socorro || LINEAR || — || align=right | 1.4 km || 
|-id=806 bgcolor=#d6d6d6
| 175806 ||  || — || September 9, 1999 || Socorro || LINEAR || — || align=right | 6.8 km || 
|-id=807 bgcolor=#d6d6d6
| 175807 ||  || — || September 9, 1999 || Socorro || LINEAR || HYG || align=right | 4.8 km || 
|-id=808 bgcolor=#fefefe
| 175808 ||  || — || September 9, 1999 || Socorro || LINEAR || — || align=right | 1.1 km || 
|-id=809 bgcolor=#fefefe
| 175809 ||  || — || September 9, 1999 || Socorro || LINEAR || Vslow || align=right data-sort-value="0.94" | 940 m || 
|-id=810 bgcolor=#fefefe
| 175810 ||  || — || September 9, 1999 || Socorro || LINEAR || FLO || align=right data-sort-value="0.95" | 950 m || 
|-id=811 bgcolor=#fefefe
| 175811 ||  || — || September 7, 1999 || Socorro || LINEAR || ERI || align=right | 4.2 km || 
|-id=812 bgcolor=#d6d6d6
| 175812 ||  || — || September 8, 1999 || Socorro || LINEAR || — || align=right | 3.2 km || 
|-id=813 bgcolor=#fefefe
| 175813 ||  || — || September 8, 1999 || Socorro || LINEAR || FLO || align=right | 1.2 km || 
|-id=814 bgcolor=#fefefe
| 175814 ||  || — || September 8, 1999 || Socorro || LINEAR || PHO || align=right | 2.7 km || 
|-id=815 bgcolor=#fefefe
| 175815 ||  || — || September 13, 1999 || Kitt Peak || Spacewatch || — || align=right | 1.1 km || 
|-id=816 bgcolor=#FA8072
| 175816 ||  || — || September 8, 1999 || Catalina || CSS || — || align=right | 1.2 km || 
|-id=817 bgcolor=#d6d6d6
| 175817 ||  || — || September 8, 1999 || Catalina || CSS || — || align=right | 6.3 km || 
|-id=818 bgcolor=#fefefe
| 175818 || 1999 SZ || — || September 16, 1999 || Kitt Peak || Spacewatch || V || align=right data-sort-value="0.96" | 960 m || 
|-id=819 bgcolor=#fefefe
| 175819 ||  || — || October 14, 1999 || Xinglong || SCAP || NYS || align=right | 1.0 km || 
|-id=820 bgcolor=#fefefe
| 175820 ||  || — || October 3, 1999 || Socorro || LINEAR || — || align=right | 1.3 km || 
|-id=821 bgcolor=#fefefe
| 175821 ||  || — || October 4, 1999 || Socorro || LINEAR || NYS || align=right | 1.1 km || 
|-id=822 bgcolor=#fefefe
| 175822 ||  || — || October 15, 1999 || Anderson Mesa || LONEOS || CHL || align=right | 2.4 km || 
|-id=823 bgcolor=#fefefe
| 175823 ||  || — || October 3, 1999 || Kitt Peak || Spacewatch || FLO || align=right | 1.0 km || 
|-id=824 bgcolor=#fefefe
| 175824 ||  || — || October 4, 1999 || Kitt Peak || Spacewatch || — || align=right | 1.2 km || 
|-id=825 bgcolor=#fefefe
| 175825 ||  || — || October 6, 1999 || Kitt Peak || Spacewatch || NYS || align=right | 1.2 km || 
|-id=826 bgcolor=#fefefe
| 175826 ||  || — || October 7, 1999 || Kitt Peak || Spacewatch || — || align=right | 1.5 km || 
|-id=827 bgcolor=#fefefe
| 175827 ||  || — || October 9, 1999 || Kitt Peak || Spacewatch || — || align=right data-sort-value="0.94" | 940 m || 
|-id=828 bgcolor=#E9E9E9
| 175828 ||  || — || October 2, 1999 || Socorro || LINEAR || — || align=right | 1.8 km || 
|-id=829 bgcolor=#fefefe
| 175829 ||  || — || October 2, 1999 || Socorro || LINEAR || — || align=right | 1.2 km || 
|-id=830 bgcolor=#fefefe
| 175830 ||  || — || October 3, 1999 || Socorro || LINEAR || FLO || align=right | 1.1 km || 
|-id=831 bgcolor=#fefefe
| 175831 ||  || — || October 4, 1999 || Socorro || LINEAR || NYS || align=right | 1.1 km || 
|-id=832 bgcolor=#fefefe
| 175832 ||  || — || October 4, 1999 || Socorro || LINEAR || NYS || align=right | 1.0 km || 
|-id=833 bgcolor=#fefefe
| 175833 ||  || — || October 4, 1999 || Socorro || LINEAR || FLO || align=right | 1.1 km || 
|-id=834 bgcolor=#fefefe
| 175834 ||  || — || October 6, 1999 || Socorro || LINEAR || NYS || align=right | 1.0 km || 
|-id=835 bgcolor=#fefefe
| 175835 ||  || — || October 6, 1999 || Socorro || LINEAR || MAS || align=right | 1.0 km || 
|-id=836 bgcolor=#fefefe
| 175836 ||  || — || October 6, 1999 || Socorro || LINEAR || — || align=right | 2.6 km || 
|-id=837 bgcolor=#fefefe
| 175837 ||  || — || October 6, 1999 || Socorro || LINEAR || FLO || align=right | 1.0 km || 
|-id=838 bgcolor=#fefefe
| 175838 ||  || — || October 7, 1999 || Socorro || LINEAR || — || align=right | 1.2 km || 
|-id=839 bgcolor=#fefefe
| 175839 ||  || — || October 10, 1999 || Socorro || LINEAR || SUL || align=right | 3.3 km || 
|-id=840 bgcolor=#fefefe
| 175840 ||  || — || October 12, 1999 || Socorro || LINEAR || V || align=right | 1.1 km || 
|-id=841 bgcolor=#fefefe
| 175841 ||  || — || October 12, 1999 || Socorro || LINEAR || V || align=right | 1.4 km || 
|-id=842 bgcolor=#fefefe
| 175842 ||  || — || October 12, 1999 || Socorro || LINEAR || V || align=right | 1.0 km || 
|-id=843 bgcolor=#fefefe
| 175843 ||  || — || October 13, 1999 || Socorro || LINEAR || V || align=right | 1.00 km || 
|-id=844 bgcolor=#fefefe
| 175844 ||  || — || October 15, 1999 || Socorro || LINEAR || NYS || align=right | 1.1 km || 
|-id=845 bgcolor=#fefefe
| 175845 ||  || — || October 3, 1999 || Socorro || LINEAR || V || align=right | 1.2 km || 
|-id=846 bgcolor=#fefefe
| 175846 ||  || — || October 9, 1999 || Socorro || LINEAR || NYS || align=right data-sort-value="0.97" | 970 m || 
|-id=847 bgcolor=#fefefe
| 175847 ||  || — || October 12, 1999 || Socorro || LINEAR || — || align=right | 3.1 km || 
|-id=848 bgcolor=#fefefe
| 175848 ||  || — || October 1, 1999 || Catalina || CSS || — || align=right | 1.4 km || 
|-id=849 bgcolor=#fefefe
| 175849 ||  || — || October 3, 1999 || Kitt Peak || Spacewatch || V || align=right | 1.0 km || 
|-id=850 bgcolor=#fefefe
| 175850 ||  || — || October 11, 1999 || Kitt Peak || Spacewatch || — || align=right | 1.3 km || 
|-id=851 bgcolor=#FA8072
| 175851 ||  || — || October 29, 1999 || Socorro || LINEAR || H || align=right | 1.2 km || 
|-id=852 bgcolor=#E9E9E9
| 175852 ||  || — || October 29, 1999 || Catalina || CSS || — || align=right | 1.5 km || 
|-id=853 bgcolor=#fefefe
| 175853 ||  || — || October 30, 1999 || Kitt Peak || Spacewatch || — || align=right | 1.6 km || 
|-id=854 bgcolor=#fefefe
| 175854 ||  || — || October 29, 1999 || Catalina || CSS || V || align=right | 1.1 km || 
|-id=855 bgcolor=#fefefe
| 175855 ||  || — || October 30, 1999 || Catalina || CSS || — || align=right | 1.8 km || 
|-id=856 bgcolor=#fefefe
| 175856 ||  || — || October 28, 1999 || Catalina || CSS || V || align=right | 1.3 km || 
|-id=857 bgcolor=#fefefe
| 175857 ||  || — || October 31, 1999 || Catalina || CSS || V || align=right | 1.2 km || 
|-id=858 bgcolor=#fefefe
| 175858 || 1999 VL || — || November 2, 1999 || Oaxaca || J. M. Roe || MAS || align=right | 1.4 km || 
|-id=859 bgcolor=#fefefe
| 175859 ||  || — || November 1, 1999 || Kitt Peak || Spacewatch || MAS || align=right data-sort-value="0.98" | 980 m || 
|-id=860 bgcolor=#fefefe
| 175860 ||  || — || November 2, 1999 || Kitt Peak || Spacewatch || — || align=right | 1.2 km || 
|-id=861 bgcolor=#E9E9E9
| 175861 ||  || — || November 3, 1999 || Socorro || LINEAR || — || align=right | 2.1 km || 
|-id=862 bgcolor=#E9E9E9
| 175862 ||  || — || November 1, 1999 || Kitt Peak || Spacewatch || — || align=right | 1.4 km || 
|-id=863 bgcolor=#fefefe
| 175863 ||  || — || November 4, 1999 || Socorro || LINEAR || NYS || align=right | 1.2 km || 
|-id=864 bgcolor=#fefefe
| 175864 ||  || — || November 4, 1999 || Socorro || LINEAR || — || align=right | 1.3 km || 
|-id=865 bgcolor=#E9E9E9
| 175865 ||  || — || November 4, 1999 || Socorro || LINEAR || — || align=right | 1.8 km || 
|-id=866 bgcolor=#fefefe
| 175866 ||  || — || November 4, 1999 || Socorro || LINEAR || — || align=right | 1.3 km || 
|-id=867 bgcolor=#fefefe
| 175867 ||  || — || November 7, 1999 || Socorro || LINEAR || — || align=right | 3.2 km || 
|-id=868 bgcolor=#fefefe
| 175868 ||  || — || November 5, 1999 || Socorro || LINEAR || — || align=right | 1.3 km || 
|-id=869 bgcolor=#E9E9E9
| 175869 ||  || — || November 5, 1999 || Kitt Peak || Spacewatch || — || align=right | 1.8 km || 
|-id=870 bgcolor=#fefefe
| 175870 ||  || — || November 10, 1999 || Kitt Peak || Spacewatch || — || align=right | 1.1 km || 
|-id=871 bgcolor=#fefefe
| 175871 ||  || — || November 6, 1999 || Kitt Peak || Spacewatch || MAS || align=right data-sort-value="0.90" | 900 m || 
|-id=872 bgcolor=#fefefe
| 175872 ||  || — || November 9, 1999 || Kitt Peak || Spacewatch || NYS || align=right data-sort-value="0.92" | 920 m || 
|-id=873 bgcolor=#E9E9E9
| 175873 ||  || — || November 9, 1999 || Socorro || LINEAR || — || align=right | 3.7 km || 
|-id=874 bgcolor=#fefefe
| 175874 ||  || — || November 10, 1999 || Kitt Peak || Spacewatch || — || align=right data-sort-value="0.87" | 870 m || 
|-id=875 bgcolor=#fefefe
| 175875 ||  || — || November 14, 1999 || Socorro || LINEAR || V || align=right | 1.3 km || 
|-id=876 bgcolor=#fefefe
| 175876 ||  || — || November 11, 1999 || Kitt Peak || Spacewatch || NYS || align=right data-sort-value="0.92" | 920 m || 
|-id=877 bgcolor=#fefefe
| 175877 ||  || — || November 14, 1999 || Socorro || LINEAR || NYS || align=right | 1.2 km || 
|-id=878 bgcolor=#fefefe
| 175878 ||  || — || November 14, 1999 || Socorro || LINEAR || NYS || align=right data-sort-value="0.91" | 910 m || 
|-id=879 bgcolor=#E9E9E9
| 175879 ||  || — || November 9, 1999 || Socorro || LINEAR || — || align=right | 1.2 km || 
|-id=880 bgcolor=#fefefe
| 175880 ||  || — || November 15, 1999 || Socorro || LINEAR || — || align=right | 1.3 km || 
|-id=881 bgcolor=#fefefe
| 175881 ||  || — || November 15, 1999 || Socorro || LINEAR || NYS || align=right | 1.0 km || 
|-id=882 bgcolor=#fefefe
| 175882 ||  || — || November 9, 1999 || Socorro || LINEAR || — || align=right | 1.5 km || 
|-id=883 bgcolor=#E9E9E9
| 175883 ||  || — || November 6, 1999 || Catalina || CSS || MAR || align=right | 2.0 km || 
|-id=884 bgcolor=#fefefe
| 175884 ||  || — || November 5, 1999 || Socorro || LINEAR || V || align=right | 1.0 km || 
|-id=885 bgcolor=#fefefe
| 175885 ||  || — || November 14, 1999 || Socorro || LINEAR || — || align=right | 1.8 km || 
|-id=886 bgcolor=#E9E9E9
| 175886 ||  || — || November 12, 1999 || Socorro || LINEAR || — || align=right | 1.3 km || 
|-id=887 bgcolor=#fefefe
| 175887 ||  || — || November 29, 1999 || Monte Agliale || S. Donati || V || align=right data-sort-value="0.96" | 960 m || 
|-id=888 bgcolor=#fefefe
| 175888 ||  || — || November 28, 1999 || Kitt Peak || Spacewatch || MAS || align=right | 1.2 km || 
|-id=889 bgcolor=#fefefe
| 175889 ||  || — || November 29, 1999 || Kitt Peak || Spacewatch || — || align=right data-sort-value="0.92" | 920 m || 
|-id=890 bgcolor=#fefefe
| 175890 ||  || — || December 4, 1999 || Catalina || CSS || NYS || align=right | 1.3 km || 
|-id=891 bgcolor=#E9E9E9
| 175891 ||  || — || December 7, 1999 || Socorro || LINEAR || — || align=right | 1.4 km || 
|-id=892 bgcolor=#fefefe
| 175892 ||  || — || December 7, 1999 || Socorro || LINEAR || — || align=right | 1.4 km || 
|-id=893 bgcolor=#E9E9E9
| 175893 ||  || — || December 7, 1999 || Socorro || LINEAR || — || align=right | 1.4 km || 
|-id=894 bgcolor=#fefefe
| 175894 ||  || — || December 7, 1999 || Socorro || LINEAR || MAS || align=right | 1.1 km || 
|-id=895 bgcolor=#fefefe
| 175895 ||  || — || December 7, 1999 || Catalina || CSS || — || align=right | 2.7 km || 
|-id=896 bgcolor=#E9E9E9
| 175896 ||  || — || December 12, 1999 || Socorro || LINEAR || — || align=right | 2.3 km || 
|-id=897 bgcolor=#E9E9E9
| 175897 ||  || — || December 6, 1999 || Kitt Peak || Spacewatch || — || align=right | 2.0 km || 
|-id=898 bgcolor=#fefefe
| 175898 ||  || — || December 12, 1999 || Socorro || LINEAR || — || align=right | 1.4 km || 
|-id=899 bgcolor=#E9E9E9
| 175899 ||  || — || December 12, 1999 || Socorro || LINEAR || HNS || align=right | 1.8 km || 
|-id=900 bgcolor=#fefefe
| 175900 ||  || — || December 13, 1999 || Kitt Peak || Spacewatch || — || align=right | 1.7 km || 
|}

175901–176000 

|-bgcolor=#fefefe
| 175901 ||  || — || December 7, 1999 || Socorro || LINEAR || NYS || align=right data-sort-value="0.69" | 690 m || 
|-id=902 bgcolor=#fefefe
| 175902 ||  || — || December 19, 1999 || Socorro || LINEAR || H || align=right | 1.4 km || 
|-id=903 bgcolor=#fefefe
| 175903 ||  || — || December 29, 1999 || EverStaR || Everstar Obs. || NYS || align=right | 1.2 km || 
|-id=904 bgcolor=#fefefe
| 175904 ||  || — || December 27, 1999 || Kitt Peak || Spacewatch || MAS || align=right data-sort-value="0.92" | 920 m || 
|-id=905 bgcolor=#E9E9E9
| 175905 ||  || — || December 31, 1999 || Catalina || CSS || — || align=right | 2.7 km || 
|-id=906 bgcolor=#fefefe
| 175906 ||  || — || December 31, 1999 || Kitt Peak || Spacewatch || — || align=right | 1.1 km || 
|-id=907 bgcolor=#fefefe
| 175907 ||  || — || January 3, 2000 || Socorro || LINEAR || — || align=right | 1.2 km || 
|-id=908 bgcolor=#fefefe
| 175908 ||  || — || January 5, 2000 || Socorro || LINEAR || H || align=right | 1.5 km || 
|-id=909 bgcolor=#E9E9E9
| 175909 ||  || — || January 4, 2000 || Socorro || LINEAR || — || align=right | 3.1 km || 
|-id=910 bgcolor=#fefefe
| 175910 ||  || — || January 3, 2000 || Socorro || LINEAR || — || align=right | 3.5 km || 
|-id=911 bgcolor=#fefefe
| 175911 ||  || — || January 3, 2000 || Kitt Peak || Spacewatch || — || align=right data-sort-value="0.93" | 930 m || 
|-id=912 bgcolor=#fefefe
| 175912 ||  || — || January 6, 2000 || Kitt Peak || Spacewatch || NYS || align=right data-sort-value="0.97" | 970 m || 
|-id=913 bgcolor=#E9E9E9
| 175913 ||  || — || January 28, 2000 || Kitt Peak || Spacewatch || MIS || align=right | 4.0 km || 
|-id=914 bgcolor=#E9E9E9
| 175914 ||  || — || January 27, 2000 || Kitt Peak || Spacewatch || — || align=right | 1.2 km || 
|-id=915 bgcolor=#E9E9E9
| 175915 ||  || — || February 2, 2000 || Socorro || LINEAR || — || align=right | 5.5 km || 
|-id=916 bgcolor=#fefefe
| 175916 ||  || — || February 2, 2000 || Socorro || LINEAR || — || align=right | 2.7 km || 
|-id=917 bgcolor=#fefefe
| 175917 ||  || — || February 1, 2000 || Kitt Peak || Spacewatch || MAS || align=right | 1.2 km || 
|-id=918 bgcolor=#fefefe
| 175918 ||  || — || February 2, 2000 || Socorro || LINEAR || — || align=right | 1.6 km || 
|-id=919 bgcolor=#E9E9E9
| 175919 ||  || — || February 7, 2000 || Catalina || CSS || — || align=right | 2.7 km || 
|-id=920 bgcolor=#E9E9E9
| 175920 Francisnimmo ||  ||  || February 5, 2000 || Kitt Peak || M. W. Buie || — || align=right | 1.4 km || 
|-id=921 bgcolor=#FFC2E0
| 175921 ||  || — || February 16, 2000 || Catalina || CSS || APO +1km || align=right | 1.0 km || 
|-id=922 bgcolor=#E9E9E9
| 175922 ||  || — || February 27, 2000 || Kitt Peak || Spacewatch || — || align=right | 1.2 km || 
|-id=923 bgcolor=#E9E9E9
| 175923 ||  || — || February 29, 2000 || Socorro || LINEAR || BRU || align=right | 2.5 km || 
|-id=924 bgcolor=#E9E9E9
| 175924 ||  || — || February 29, 2000 || Socorro || LINEAR || — || align=right | 1.4 km || 
|-id=925 bgcolor=#E9E9E9
| 175925 ||  || — || February 29, 2000 || Socorro || LINEAR || — || align=right | 1.1 km || 
|-id=926 bgcolor=#E9E9E9
| 175926 ||  || — || February 29, 2000 || Socorro || LINEAR || — || align=right | 1.4 km || 
|-id=927 bgcolor=#E9E9E9
| 175927 ||  || — || February 29, 2000 || Socorro || LINEAR || — || align=right | 1.4 km || 
|-id=928 bgcolor=#fefefe
| 175928 ||  || — || February 29, 2000 || Socorro || LINEAR || H || align=right | 1.0 km || 
|-id=929 bgcolor=#E9E9E9
| 175929 ||  || — || February 29, 2000 || Socorro || LINEAR || — || align=right | 3.0 km || 
|-id=930 bgcolor=#E9E9E9
| 175930 ||  || — || February 27, 2000 || Kitt Peak || Spacewatch || — || align=right | 2.7 km || 
|-id=931 bgcolor=#E9E9E9
| 175931 ||  || — || February 29, 2000 || Socorro || LINEAR || — || align=right | 1.4 km || 
|-id=932 bgcolor=#E9E9E9
| 175932 ||  || — || February 25, 2000 || Kitt Peak || Spacewatch || — || align=right | 1.5 km || 
|-id=933 bgcolor=#E9E9E9
| 175933 ||  || — || March 3, 2000 || Socorro || LINEAR || — || align=right | 1.4 km || 
|-id=934 bgcolor=#fefefe
| 175934 ||  || — || March 9, 2000 || Socorro || LINEAR || H || align=right | 1.4 km || 
|-id=935 bgcolor=#E9E9E9
| 175935 ||  || — || March 3, 2000 || Kitt Peak || Spacewatch || — || align=right | 1.0 km || 
|-id=936 bgcolor=#d6d6d6
| 175936 ||  || — || March 10, 2000 || Kitt Peak || Spacewatch || SHU3:2 || align=right | 7.4 km || 
|-id=937 bgcolor=#E9E9E9
| 175937 ||  || — || March 11, 2000 || Anderson Mesa || LONEOS || — || align=right | 4.4 km || 
|-id=938 bgcolor=#E9E9E9
| 175938 ||  || — || March 11, 2000 || Anderson Mesa || LONEOS || — || align=right | 1.4 km || 
|-id=939 bgcolor=#E9E9E9
| 175939 ||  || — || March 11, 2000 || Anderson Mesa || LONEOS || — || align=right | 1.3 km || 
|-id=940 bgcolor=#fefefe
| 175940 ||  || — || March 3, 2000 || Catalina || CSS || H || align=right data-sort-value="0.98" | 980 m || 
|-id=941 bgcolor=#E9E9E9
| 175941 ||  || — || March 27, 2000 || Anderson Mesa || LONEOS || JUN || align=right | 1.8 km || 
|-id=942 bgcolor=#E9E9E9
| 175942 ||  || — || March 29, 2000 || Socorro || LINEAR || — || align=right | 2.1 km || 
|-id=943 bgcolor=#FA8072
| 175943 ||  || — || April 2, 2000 || Socorro || LINEAR || — || align=right | 1.9 km || 
|-id=944 bgcolor=#fefefe
| 175944 ||  || — || April 3, 2000 || Socorro || LINEAR || H || align=right | 1.2 km || 
|-id=945 bgcolor=#E9E9E9
| 175945 ||  || — || April 5, 2000 || Socorro || LINEAR || — || align=right | 4.1 km || 
|-id=946 bgcolor=#E9E9E9
| 175946 ||  || — || April 5, 2000 || Socorro || LINEAR || — || align=right | 3.6 km || 
|-id=947 bgcolor=#E9E9E9
| 175947 ||  || — || April 5, 2000 || Socorro || LINEAR || — || align=right | 1.4 km || 
|-id=948 bgcolor=#E9E9E9
| 175948 ||  || — || April 5, 2000 || Socorro || LINEAR || — || align=right | 2.6 km || 
|-id=949 bgcolor=#E9E9E9
| 175949 ||  || — || April 5, 2000 || Socorro || LINEAR || GEF || align=right | 2.2 km || 
|-id=950 bgcolor=#E9E9E9
| 175950 ||  || — || April 7, 2000 || Socorro || LINEAR || — || align=right | 2.5 km || 
|-id=951 bgcolor=#E9E9E9
| 175951 ||  || — || April 7, 2000 || Anderson Mesa || LONEOS || — || align=right | 1.9 km || 
|-id=952 bgcolor=#E9E9E9
| 175952 ||  || — || April 5, 2000 || Socorro || LINEAR || — || align=right | 3.7 km || 
|-id=953 bgcolor=#E9E9E9
| 175953 ||  || — || April 3, 2000 || Kitt Peak || Spacewatch || — || align=right | 1.6 km || 
|-id=954 bgcolor=#E9E9E9
| 175954 ||  || — || April 5, 2000 || Anderson Mesa || LONEOS || — || align=right | 1.6 km || 
|-id=955 bgcolor=#E9E9E9
| 175955 ||  || — || April 27, 2000 || Kitt Peak || Spacewatch || WIT || align=right | 1.5 km || 
|-id=956 bgcolor=#E9E9E9
| 175956 ||  || — || April 25, 2000 || Anderson Mesa || LONEOS || — || align=right | 1.5 km || 
|-id=957 bgcolor=#E9E9E9
| 175957 ||  || — || April 25, 2000 || Anderson Mesa || LONEOS || — || align=right | 2.1 km || 
|-id=958 bgcolor=#E9E9E9
| 175958 ||  || — || April 28, 2000 || Anderson Mesa || LONEOS || JUN || align=right | 1.9 km || 
|-id=959 bgcolor=#E9E9E9
| 175959 ||  || — || April 30, 2000 || Anderson Mesa || LONEOS || — || align=right | 2.0 km || 
|-id=960 bgcolor=#E9E9E9
| 175960 ||  || — || April 30, 2000 || Haleakala || NEAT || — || align=right | 3.4 km || 
|-id=961 bgcolor=#E9E9E9
| 175961 ||  || — || May 2, 2000 || Socorro || LINEAR || — || align=right | 3.9 km || 
|-id=962 bgcolor=#E9E9E9
| 175962 ||  || — || May 7, 2000 || Socorro || LINEAR || MAR || align=right | 1.8 km || 
|-id=963 bgcolor=#E9E9E9
| 175963 ||  || — || May 4, 2000 || Kitt Peak || Spacewatch || — || align=right | 1.8 km || 
|-id=964 bgcolor=#E9E9E9
| 175964 ||  || — || May 5, 2000 || Socorro || LINEAR || — || align=right | 5.4 km || 
|-id=965 bgcolor=#E9E9E9
| 175965 ||  || — || May 7, 2000 || Socorro || LINEAR || — || align=right | 1.5 km || 
|-id=966 bgcolor=#E9E9E9
| 175966 ||  || — || May 28, 2000 || Kitt Peak || Spacewatch || — || align=right | 2.3 km || 
|-id=967 bgcolor=#E9E9E9
| 175967 ||  || — || May 27, 2000 || Anderson Mesa || LONEOS || INO || align=right | 2.2 km || 
|-id=968 bgcolor=#E9E9E9
| 175968 ||  || — || June 5, 2000 || Socorro || LINEAR || — || align=right | 3.1 km || 
|-id=969 bgcolor=#E9E9E9
| 175969 ||  || — || June 7, 2000 || Bergisch Gladbach || W. Bickel || — || align=right | 3.7 km || 
|-id=970 bgcolor=#E9E9E9
| 175970 ||  || — || June 1, 2000 || Socorro || LINEAR || — || align=right | 3.8 km || 
|-id=971 bgcolor=#E9E9E9
| 175971 ||  || — || June 1, 2000 || Anderson Mesa || LONEOS || — || align=right | 2.5 km || 
|-id=972 bgcolor=#E9E9E9
| 175972 ||  || — || June 7, 2000 || Kitt Peak || Spacewatch || WIT || align=right | 1.6 km || 
|-id=973 bgcolor=#fefefe
| 175973 ||  || — || July 5, 2000 || Anderson Mesa || LONEOS || — || align=right | 1.3 km || 
|-id=974 bgcolor=#d6d6d6
| 175974 ||  || — || July 5, 2000 || Anderson Mesa || LONEOS || — || align=right | 6.9 km || 
|-id=975 bgcolor=#fefefe
| 175975 ||  || — || July 24, 2000 || Socorro || LINEAR || — || align=right | 1.4 km || 
|-id=976 bgcolor=#d6d6d6
| 175976 ||  || — || July 30, 2000 || Socorro || LINEAR || — || align=right | 5.4 km || 
|-id=977 bgcolor=#E9E9E9
| 175977 ||  || — || July 30, 2000 || Socorro || LINEAR || — || align=right | 3.3 km || 
|-id=978 bgcolor=#E9E9E9
| 175978 ||  || — || August 1, 2000 || Socorro || LINEAR || — || align=right | 3.7 km || 
|-id=979 bgcolor=#d6d6d6
| 175979 ||  || — || August 5, 2000 || Haleakala || NEAT || ALA || align=right | 9.4 km || 
|-id=980 bgcolor=#E9E9E9
| 175980 ||  || — || August 24, 2000 || Socorro || LINEAR || TIN || align=right | 3.8 km || 
|-id=981 bgcolor=#d6d6d6
| 175981 ||  || — || August 24, 2000 || Socorro || LINEAR || BRA || align=right | 3.4 km || 
|-id=982 bgcolor=#d6d6d6
| 175982 ||  || — || August 24, 2000 || Socorro || LINEAR || — || align=right | 5.2 km || 
|-id=983 bgcolor=#fefefe
| 175983 ||  || — || August 24, 2000 || Socorro || LINEAR || — || align=right | 1.1 km || 
|-id=984 bgcolor=#fefefe
| 175984 ||  || — || August 24, 2000 || Socorro || LINEAR || FLO || align=right | 1.0 km || 
|-id=985 bgcolor=#d6d6d6
| 175985 ||  || — || August 24, 2000 || Socorro || LINEAR || — || align=right | 4.3 km || 
|-id=986 bgcolor=#d6d6d6
| 175986 ||  || — || August 24, 2000 || Socorro || LINEAR || EOS || align=right | 3.2 km || 
|-id=987 bgcolor=#d6d6d6
| 175987 ||  || — || August 24, 2000 || Socorro || LINEAR || — || align=right | 3.8 km || 
|-id=988 bgcolor=#d6d6d6
| 175988 ||  || — || August 24, 2000 || Socorro || LINEAR || — || align=right | 4.7 km || 
|-id=989 bgcolor=#d6d6d6
| 175989 ||  || — || August 26, 2000 || Socorro || LINEAR || TIR || align=right | 5.4 km || 
|-id=990 bgcolor=#d6d6d6
| 175990 ||  || — || August 25, 2000 || Socorro || LINEAR || — || align=right | 6.1 km || 
|-id=991 bgcolor=#d6d6d6
| 175991 ||  || — || August 24, 2000 || Socorro || LINEAR || EUP || align=right | 8.5 km || 
|-id=992 bgcolor=#d6d6d6
| 175992 ||  || — || August 26, 2000 || Socorro || LINEAR || — || align=right | 4.4 km || 
|-id=993 bgcolor=#d6d6d6
| 175993 ||  || — || August 31, 2000 || Socorro || LINEAR || — || align=right | 4.9 km || 
|-id=994 bgcolor=#d6d6d6
| 175994 ||  || — || August 31, 2000 || Socorro || LINEAR || LIX || align=right | 6.1 km || 
|-id=995 bgcolor=#E9E9E9
| 175995 ||  || — || August 31, 2000 || Socorro || LINEAR || JUN || align=right | 1.9 km || 
|-id=996 bgcolor=#d6d6d6
| 175996 ||  || — || August 31, 2000 || Socorro || LINEAR || — || align=right | 3.3 km || 
|-id=997 bgcolor=#d6d6d6
| 175997 ||  || — || August 31, 2000 || Socorro || LINEAR || — || align=right | 4.8 km || 
|-id=998 bgcolor=#fefefe
| 175998 ||  || — || August 31, 2000 || Socorro || LINEAR || FLO || align=right data-sort-value="0.81" | 810 m || 
|-id=999 bgcolor=#d6d6d6
| 175999 ||  || — || August 31, 2000 || Socorro || LINEAR || — || align=right | 5.6 km || 
|-id=000 bgcolor=#d6d6d6
| 176000 ||  || — || August 31, 2000 || Socorro || LINEAR || — || align=right | 7.7 km || 
|}

References

External links 
 Discovery Circumstances: Numbered Minor Planets (175001)–(180000) (IAU Minor Planet Center)

0175